= List of Megachile species =

This list of Megachile species is an almost comprehensive listing of species of the bees belonging to the genus Megachile.

== A ==
- M. abacula Cresson, 1878
- M. abdominalis Smith, 1853
- M. abessinica Friese, 1915
- M. abluta Cockerell, 1911
- M. abnegatula Cockerell, 1937
- M. abnormis Mitchell, 1930
- M. abongana Strand, 1911
- M. acanthura Cockerell, 1937
- M. accraensis Friese, 1903
- M. acculta Cockerell, 1931
- M. acerba Mitchell, 1930
- M. acris Mitchell, 1930
- M. aculeata Vachal, 1910
- M. acutiventris Friese, 1903
- M. addenda Cresson, 1878
- M. addita Pasteels, 1965
- M. addubitans Cockerell, 1931
- M. adelaidae Cockerell, 1910
- M. adeloptera Schletterer, 1891
- M. adelphodonta Cockerell, 1924
- M. adempta Cockerell, 1931
- M. admixta Cockerell, 1931
- M. aduaensis Friese, 1909
- M. adusta (King, 1994)
- M. aequilibra Vachal, 1908
- M. aetheria Mitchell, 1930
- M. aethiops Smith, 1853
- M. affabilis Mitchell, 1930
- M. affinis Brullé, 1832
- M. afra Pasteels, 1965
- M. africanibia Strand, 1912
- M. agilis Smith, 1879
- M. agnosta Engel, 2017
- M. agustini Cockerell, 1905
- M. ainu Hirashima & Maeta, 1974
- M. akamiella Pasteels, 1965
- M. alamosana Mitchell, 1934
- M. alani Cockerell, 1929
- M. alata Mitchell, 1934
- M. albicaudella Pasteels, 1965
- M. albiceps Friese, 1903
- M. albidula Alfken, 1931
- M. albifasciata Rebmann, 1970
- M. albifascies (Alfken, 1932)
- M. albifrons Smith, 1853
- M. albimarginalis Rebmann, 1970
- M. albipila Pérez, 1895
- M. albiscopa Saussure, 1890
- M. albisecta (Klug, 1817)
- M. albitarsis Cresson, 1872
- M. albobarbata Cockerell, 1915
- M. albobasalis Smith, 1879
- M. albocincta Radoszkowski 1874
- M. albocristata Smith, 1853
- M. albohirsuta Pasteels, 1965
- M. albohirta (Brullé, 1839)
- M. albolineata Cameron, 1897
- M. albomarginata Smith, 1879
- M. albonigra Pasteels, 1973
- M. albonotata Radoszkowski 1886
- M. albopilosa Friese, 1916
- M. alboplumula Wu, 2005
- M. albopunctata Jörgensen, 1909
- M. alborufa Friese, 1911
- M. alborufula Cockerell, 1937
- M. alboscopacea Friese, 1903
- M. alleni Mitchell, 1927
- M. alleynae Rayment, 1935
- M. alopecura Cockerell, 1923
- M. alpicola Alfken, 1924
- M. alpigena Friese, 1925
- M. alta Mitchell, 1930
- M. altera Vachal, 1903
- M. alternans Friese, 1922
- M. alticola (Cameron, 1902)
- M. alucaba (Snelling, 1990)
- M. amabilis Cockerell, 1933
- M. ambigua (Pasteels, 1965)
- M. amboinensis Friese, 1909
- M. amica Cresson, 1872
- M. amoena (Pasteels, 1965)
- M. amparo Gonzalez, 2006
- M. amputata Smith, 1857
- M. analis Nylander, 1852
- M. anatolica Rebmann, 1968
- M. angelarum Cockerell, 1902
- M. angolensis (Cockerell, 1935)
- M. angularis Mitchell, 1930
- M. angulata Smith, 1853
- M. angusta Mitchell, 1930
- M. angustistrigata Alfken, 1924
- M. animosa Cockerell, 1931
- M. anodonta Cockerell, 1927
- M. anograe Cockerell, 1908
- M. anomomaculata (Pasteels, 1965)
- M. anthophila Strand, 1913
- M. anthracina Smith, 1853
- M. antinorii Gribodo, 1879
- M. antiqua Mitchell, 1930
- M. antisanellae Cameron, 1903
- M. apennina Benoist, 1940
- M. apicalis Spinola, 1808
- M. apicata Smith, 1853
- M. apicipennis Schrottky, 1902
- M. apoicola (Engel, 2011)
- M. apora Krombein, 1953
- M. apostolica Cockerell, 1937
- M. apposita Rayment, 1939
- M. arabica Friese, 1901
- M. architecta Smith, 1857
- M. arctos Vachal, 1904
- M. arcuata Cockerell, 1919
- M. arcus Mitchell, 1930
- M. ardens Smith, 1879
- M. ardua Mitchell, 1930
- M. argentina Friese, 1906
- M. aricensis Friese, 1904
- M. aridissima Cockerell, 1937
- M. armaticeps Cresson, 1869
- M. armatipes Friese, 1909
- M. armenia Tkalcu, 1992
- M. armipygata Strand, 1911
- M. armstrongi Perkins & Cheesman, 1928
- M. arnaui Moure, 1948
- M. arnoldiella (Pasteels, 1965)
- M. arundinacea Taschenberg, 1872
- M. asahinai Yasumatsu, 1955
- M. asiatica Morawitz, 1875
- M. assumptionis Schrottky, 1908
- M. asterae Mitchell, 1943
- M. astragali Mitchell, 1938
- M. astridella Pasteels, 1965
- M. asuncicola Strand, 1910
- M. asymmetrica (Snelling, 1990)
- M. atahualpa Schrottky, 1913
- M. aterrima Smith, 1861
- M. atlantica Benoist, 1934
- M. atopognatha Cockerell, 1933
- M. atrata Smith, 1853
- M. atratiformis Meade-Waldo, 1914
- M. atratula Rebmann, 1968
- M. atrella Cockerell, 1906
- M. atricoma Vachal, 1908
- M. atripes Friese, 1904
- M. atroalbida Pasteels, 1965
- M. atrocastanea (Alfken, 1932)
- M. atropyga (van der Zanden, 1995)
- M. attenuata Vachal, 1910
- M. aurantiaca Friese, 1905
- M. aurantipennis Cockerell, 1912
- M. aurata Mitchell, 1930
- M. aurea Mitchell, 1930
- M. aureiventris Schrottky, 1902
- M. auriceps Meade-Waldo, 1914
- M. auriculata (Gupta, 1989)
- M. aurifacies Pasteels, 1985
- M. aurifera Cockerell, 1935
- M. aurifrons Smith, 1853
- M. aurilabris Pasteels, 1965
- M. auripubens Rebmann, 1970
- M. aurivillii Friese, 1901
- M. aurorea Friese, 1917
- M. aurulenta (Pasteels, 1970)
- M. austeni Cockerell, 1906
- M. australasiae Dalla Torre, 1896
- M. australis H. Lucas, 1876
- M. axillaris Meade-Waldo, 1915
- M. axyx (Snelling, 1990)
- M. azarica Cockerell, 1945
- M. azteca Cresson, 1878

== B ==
- M. babylonica Rebmann, 1970
- M. badia Bingham, 1890
- M. baeri Vachal, 1904
- M. baetica (Gerstaecker, 1869)
- M. bahamensis Mitchell, 1927
- M. bakeri Cockerell, 1918
- M. bangana Cockerell, 1931
- M. banksi Mitchell, 1930
- M. barbata Smith, 1853
- M. barbatula Smith, 1879
- M. barbiellinii Moure, 1944
- M. barkeri Cockerell, 1920
- M. barvonensis Cockerell, 1914
- M. basalis Smith, 1853
- M. basirubella Pasteels, 1973
- M. batchelori Cockerell, 1929
- M. battorensis Meade-Waldo, 1912
- M. bella Mitchell, 1930
- M. bellula Bingham, 1897
- M. benigna Mitchell, 1930
- M. bentoni Cockerell, 1919
- M. bernardinensis Strand, 1910
- M. bertonii Schrottky, 1909
- M. beutenmulleri Cockerell, 1907
- M. bhavanae Bingham, 1897
- M. bicarinis Vachal, 1909
- M. bicolor (Fabricius, 1781)
- M. bicornis (King, 1994)
- M. bicornuta Friese, 1903
- M. bidentata (Fabricius, 1775)
- M. bidentis Cockerell, 1896
- M. biexcisa (Pasteels, 1970)
- M. bigibbosa Friese, 1908
- M. biloba Vachal, 1910
- M. bilobata Friese, 1915
- M. binghami Meade-Waldo, 1912
- M. binominata Smith, 1853
- M. binota Vachal, 1908
- M. binotulata Dalla Torre, 1896
- M. bioculata Pérez, 1902
- M. bipartita Smith, 1879
- M. bipunctulata (Pasteels, 1965)
- M. biroi Friese, 1903
- M. biseta Vachal, 1903
- M. bisinua Vachal, 1908
- M. bispinosa Friese, 1921
- M. bituberculata Ritsema, 1880
- M. blanda Mitchell, 1930
- M. boharti Mitchell, 1942
- M. boliviensis Friese, 1917
- M. bombiformis Gerstaecker, 1857
- M. bombycina Radoszkowski 1874
- M. bomplandensis Durante, 1996
- M. botanicarum Cockerell, 1923
- M. botucatuna Schrottky, 1913
- M. bougainvillei Cockerell, 1911
- M. brachysoma Cockerell, 1924
- M. bradleyi Mitchell, 1934
- M. brasiliensis Dalla Torre, 1896
- M. bredoi Cockerell, 1935
- M. brethesi Schrottky, 1909
- M. breviata Vachal, 1908
- M. breviceps Friese, 1898
- M. brevis Say, 1837
- M. breviuscula Smith, 1879
- M. bridarollii Moure, 1947
- M. brimleyi Mitchell, 1926
- M. brochidens Vachal, 1903
- M. brooksi Pauly, 2001
- M. browni Mitchell, 1934
- M. bruchi Schrottky, 1909
- M. bruneri Mitchell, 1934
- M. bruneriella Cockerell, 1917
- M. brunissima (Pasteels, 1965)
- M. bucephala (Fabricius, 1793)
- M. buchwaldi Mitchell, 1943
- M. buddhae Dalla Torre, 1896
- M. buehleri Schrottky, 1909
- M. bukamensis Cockerell, 1935
- M. bullata Friese, 1911
- M. burdigalensis Benoist, 1940
- M. burmeisteri Friese, 1908
- M. burungana Cockerell, 1931
- M. butonensis Friese, 1909
- M. butteli Friese, 1918
- M. buxtoni Perkins & Cheesman, 1928

== C ==
- M. caldwelli Cockerell, 1911
- M. calida Smith, 1879
- M. callura (Cockerell, 1914)
- M. campanulae (Robertson, 1903)
- M. canariensis Pérez, 1902
- M. canastra Melo & Parizotto, 2015
- M. candanga Raw, 2006
- M. candentula Cockerell, 1915
- M. candida Smith, 1879
- M. canescens (Brullé, 1832)
- M. canifrons Smith, 1853
- M. capitata Smith, 1853
- M. captionis Cockerell, 1914
- M. carbonaria Smith, 1853
- M. caricina Cockerell, 1907
- M. carinata Radoszkowski 1893
- M. carinifrons Alfken, 1926
- M. cartagenensis Mitchell, 1930
- M. carteri Cockerell, 1929
- M. casadae Cockerell, 1898
- M. castaneipes Friese, 1908
- M. catamarcensis Schrottky, 1908
- M. catulus (Cockerell, 1910)
- M. centuncularis (Linnaeus, 1758)
- M. cephalotes Smith, 1853
- M. ceratops Engel, 2017
- M. cestifera Benoist, 1954
- M. cetera Cockerell, 1912
- M. ceylonica Bingham, 1896
- M. chamacoco Schrottky, 1913
- M. chapini (Cockerell, 1935)
- M. cheesmanae (Michener, 1965)
- M. chelostomoides Gribodo, 1894
- M. chiangmaiensis Chatthanabun & Warrit, 2020
- M. chichimeca Cresson, 1878
- M. chilensis Spinola, 1851
- M. chilopsidis Cockerell, 1900
- M. chinensis Radoszkowski 1874
- M. chlorura Cockerell, 1918
- M. chomskyi Sheffield, 2013
- M. chrysognatha Cockerell, 1943
- M. chrysophila Cockerell, 1896
- M. chrysopogon Vachal, 1910
- M. chrysopyga Smith, 1853
- M. chrysopygopsis Cockerell, 1929
- M. chrysorrhoea Gerstaecker, 1857
- M. chyzeri Friese, 1909
- M. ciliatipes Cockerell, 1921
- M. cincta (Fabricius, 1781)
- M. cinctiventris Friese, 1916
- M. cincturata Cockerell, 1912
- M. cinerea Friese, 1905
- M. cingulata Friese, 1903
- M. cinnamomea Alfken, 1935
- M. circumcincta (Kirby, 1802)
- M. clara Mitchell, 1930
- M. clariceps Friese, 1917
- M. cleomis Cockerell, 1900
- M. cliffordi Rayment, 1953
- M. clio Friese, 1903
- M. clotho Smith, 1861
- M. clypeata Smith, 1853
- M. clypeosinuata Pasteels, 1985
- M. cochisiana Mitchell, 1934
- M. cockerelli Rohwer, 1923
- M. coelioxoides Cresson, 1878
- M. cognata Smith, 1853
- M. cognatiforme (Pasteels, 1970)
- M. collaris Friese, 1908
- M. colombiana Mitchell, 1930
- M. coloradensis Mitchell, 1936
- M. colorata Fox, 1896
- M. comata Cresson, 1872
- M. combinata (Pasteels, 1965)
- M. commixta (Pasteels, 1970)
- M. communis Morawitz, 1875
- M. compacta Smith, 1879
- M. compta Vachal, 1908
- M. conaminis Cockerell, 1926
- M. concava Mitchell, 1930
- M. concinna Smith, 1879
- M. concolor Friese, 1903
- M. conferta Mitchell, 1930
- M. congruata Mitchell, 1943
- M. congruens Friese, 1903
- M. coniformis Friese, 1922
- M. conjugalis Mitchell, 1930
- M. conjuncta Smith, 1853
- M. conjunctiformis Yasumatsu, 1938
- M. conradsi Friese, 1911
- M. constructrix Smith, 1879
- M. contempta Mitchell, 1930
- M. continua Mitchell, 1930
- M. coquilletti Cockerell, 1915
- M. coquimbensis Ruiz, 1938
- M. cordata Smith, 1879
- M. cordovensis Mitchell, 1930
- M. corduvensis Schrottky, 1909
- M. cornigera Friese, 1904
- M. corsica Benoist, 1935
- M. costaricensis Friese, 1917
- M. crabipedes Wu, 2005
- M. cradockensis Friese, 1909
- M. crandalli Mitchell, 1957
- M. crassepunctata Yasumatsu & Hirashima, 1965
- M. crassipes Smith, 1879
- M. crassitarsis Cockerell, 1931
- M. crassula Pérez, 1896
- M. crenulata Fox, 1896
- M. cressa (Tkalcu, 1988)
- M. creusa Bingham, 1898
- M. creutzburgi (Tkalcu, 2009)
- M. croceipennis Friese, 1917
- M. crotalariae (Schwimmer, 1980)
- M. cruziana Mitchell, 1930
- M. ctenophora Holmberg, 1886
- M. cubiceps Friese, 1906
- M. cupreohirta Cockerell, 1933
- M. curta Cresson, 1865
- M. curtilipes Vachal, 1909
- M. curtula Gerstaecker, 1857
- M. curtuloides Pasteels, 1973
- M. curvipes Smith, 1853
- M. cyanescens Friese, 1904
- M. cyanipennis Guérin-Méneville, 1845
- M. cygnorum Cockerell, 1906
- M. cylindrica Friese, 1906
- M. cypricola Mavromoustakis, 1938

== D ==
- M. dacica Mocsáry, 1879
- M. dakotensis Mitchell, 1926
- M. dalmeidai Moure, 1944
- M. dampieri Cockerell, 1907
- M. danunciae Melo & Parizotto, 2015
- M. dariensis Pasteels, 1965
- M. darwiniana Cockerell, 1906
- M. davaonensis Cockerell, 1918
- M. davidsoni Cockerell, 1902
- M. davisi Mitchell, 1930
- M. dawensis (Pasteels, 1965)
- M. deanii Rayment, 1935
- M. decemsignata Radoszkowski 1881
- M. deceptoria Pérez, 1890
- M. deceptrix Smith, 1879
- M. deflexa Cresson, 1878
- M. delectus Mitchell, 1930
- M. delphinensis Benoist, 1962
- M. demeter Cockerell, 1937
- M. densa Mitchell, 1930
- M. dentitarsus Sladen, 1919
- M. derasa Gerstaecker, 1869
- M. derelicta Cockerell, 1913
- M. derelictula Cockerell, 1937
- M. desertorum Morawitz, 1875
- M. detersa Cockerell, 1910
- M. devadatta Cockerell, 1907
- M. devexa Vachal, 1903
- M. diabolica Friese, 1898
- M. diamontana Melo & Parizotto, 2015
- M. diasi Raw, 2006
- M. difficilis Morawitz, 1875
- M. digiticauda Cockerell, 1937
- M. digna Mitchell, 1930
- M. diligens Smith, 1879
- M. dimidiata Smith, 1853
- M. dinognatha Cockerell, 1929
- M. dinura Cockerell, 1911
- M. diodontura Cockerell, 1922
- M. discolor Smith, 1853
- M. discorhina Cockerell, 1924
- M. discriminata Rebmann, 1968
- M. disjuncta (Fabricius, 1781)
- M. disjunctiformis Cockerell, 1911
- M. disputabilis Krombein, 1951
- M. distinguenda Ruiz, 1941
- M. diversa Mitchell, 1930
- M. doanei Cockerell, 1908
- M. doddiana Cockerell, 1906
- M. dohrandti Morawitz, 1880
- M. doleschalli Cockerell, 1907
- M. dolichognatha Cockerell, 1931
- M. dolichosoma Benoist, 1962
- M. dolichotricha Cockerell, 1927
- M. donata Mitchell, 1930
- M. donbakeri (Gonzalez and Engel, 2012)
- M. dorsalis Pérez, 1879
- M. dorsata Smith, 1853
- M. droegei Sheffield & Genaro, 2013
- M. duala Strand, 1914
- M. dubiosa Friese, 1909
- M. duboulaii (Smith, 1865)
- M. dulciana Mitchell, 1934
- M. dupla Ritsema, 1880
- M. durantae Gonzalez, Griswold & Engel, 2018

== E ==
- M. ebenea (King, 1994)
- M. eburnipes Vachal, 1904
- M. ecplectica (Snelling, 1990)
- M. ecuadoria Friese, 1904
- M. edentata Friese, 1925
- M. edwardsi Friese, 1922
- M. edwardsiana Friese, 1925
- M. electrum Mitchell, 1930
- M. elizabethae Bingham, 1897
- M. elongata Smith, 1879
- M. emexae (King, 1994)
- M. empeyi (Pasteels, 1970)
- M. enceliae Cockerell, 1926
- M. epixanthula Cockerell, 1931
- M. ericetorum Lepeletier, 1841
- M. erimae Mocsáry, 1899
- M. erythropyga Smith, 1853
- M. erythrura (Pasteels, 1970)
- M. esakii Yasumatsu, 1935
- M. esora Cameron, 1903
- M. esseniensis (Pasteels, 1979)
- M. estebana Cockerell, 1924
- M. eucalypti Cockerell, 1910
- M. eulaliae Cockerell, 1917
- M. eupyrrha Cockerell, 1937
- M. eurimera Smith, 1854
- M. eurycephala Wu, 2005
- M. euzona Pérez, 1899
- M. exaltata Smith, 1853
- M. excavata Cockerell, 1937
- M. exilis Cresson, 1872
- M. eximia Friese, 1903
- M. expleta Mitchell, 1930
- M. exsecta Pasteels, 1965

== F ==
- M. fabricator Smith, 1868
- M. faceta Bingham, 1897
- M. facetula Cockerell, 1918
- M. facialis Vachal, 1908
- M. falcidentata Moure & Silveira, 1992
- M. familiaris Cockerell, 1916
- M. fasciatella Friese, 1905
- M. fastidiosa Mitchell, 1930
- M. fastigiata Vachal, 1910
- M. feijeni Schulten, 1977
- M. felicis Mitchell, 1930
- M. felina Gerstaecker, 1857
- M. femoratella Cockerell, 1918
- M. ferox Smith, 1879
- M. ferruginea Friese, 1903
- M. ferruginea (King & Exley, 1985) (Homonym)
- M. ferruginosa Mitchell, 1930
- M. fertoni Pérez, 1896
- M. fervida Smith, 1853
- M. fidelis Cresson, 1878
- M. fiebrigi Schrottky, 1908
- M. filicornis Friese, 1908
- M. fimbriata Smith, 1853
- M. fimbriventris Friese, 1911
- M. finschi Friese, 1911
- M. flabellipes Pérez, 1895
- M. flammiventris Vachal, 1908
- M. flavicrinis Vachal, 1908
- M. flavidula Rebmann, 1970
- M. flavihirsuta Mitchell, 1930
- M. flavipennis Smith, 1853
- M. flavipes Spinola, 1838
- M. flavofasciata Wu, 1982
- M. fletcheri Cockerell, 1919
- M. florensis Mitchell, 1943
- M. foersteri Gerstaecker, 1869
- M. foliata Smith, 1861
- M. forbesii Cockerell, 1937
- M. formosa (Pasteels, 1970)
- M. fortis Cresson, 1872
- M. framea Schrottky, 1913
- M. franki (Friese, 1920)
- M. frankieana Raw, 2006
- M. fraterna Smith, 1853
- M. friesei Schrottky, 1902
- M. frigida Smith, 1853
- M. frontalis (Fabricius, 1804)
- M. frugalis Cresson, 1872
- M. fruticosa Mitchell, 1930
- M. fucata Mitchell, 1934
- M. fuerteventurae (Tkalcu, 1993)
- M. fuliginosa Friese, 1925
- M. fullawayi Cockerell, 1914
- M. fultoni Cockerell, 1913
- M. fulva Smith, 1853
- M. fulvescens Smith, 1853
- M. fulvifrons Smith, 1858
- M. fulvimana Eversmann, 1852
- M. fulvipennis Smith, 1879
- M. fulvitarsis Friese, 1909
- M. fulvofasciata Radoszkowski 1882
- M. fulvohirta Friese, 1904
- M. fulvomarginata Cockerell, 1906
- M. fumata Mitchell, 1930
- M. fumipennis Smith, 1868
- M. funebris Radoszkowski 1874
- M. funeraria Smith, 1863
- M. funnelli Cockerell, 1907
- M. furcata Vachal, 1909
- M. fusca Friese, 1903
- M. fuscicauda Cockerell, 1933
- M. fuscitarsis Cockerell, 1912
- M. futilis Mitchell, 1930

== G ==
- M. gahani Cockerell, 1906
- M. galactogagates Gribodo, 1894
- M. gambiensis Cockerell, 1937
- M. garambana Pasteels, 1965
- M. garleppi Friese, 1904
- M. gastracantha Cockerell, 1931
- M. gathela Cameron, 1908
- M. gemula Cresson, 1878
- M. genalis Morawitz, 1880
- M. geneana (Gribodo, 1894)
- M. gentilis Cresson, 1872
- M. geoffrei Cockerell, 1920
- M. georgica Cresson, 1878
- M. gessi Eardley, 2012
- M. gessorum Eardley, 2012
- M. ghillianii Spinola, 1843
- M. gibbidens Vachal, 1910
- M. gibboclypearis Pasteels, 1979
- M. gibbsi (Gonzalez and Engel, 2012)
- M. gigantea Friese, 1911
- M. gigas Schrottky, 1908
- M. gigas Wu, 2005 (Homonym)
- M. gilbertiella Cockerell, 1910
- M. giliae Cockerell, 1906
- M. giraudi Gerstaecker, 1869
- M. globiceps (Pasteels, 1970)
- M. gobabebensis Eardley, 2013
- M. godeffroyi Friese, 1911
- M. goegabensis Eardley, 2013
- M. gomphrenae Holmberg, 1886
- M. gomphrenoides Vachal, 1908
- M. gordoni Cockerell, 1937
- M. gothalauniensis Pérez, 1902
- M. gowdeyi Cockerell, 1931
- M. gracilis Schrottky, 1902
- M. grandibarbis Pérez, 1899
- M. gravita Mitchell, 1934
- M. grisea (Fabricius, 1794)
- M. griseola Cockerell, 1931
- M. griseopicta Radoszkowski 1882
- M. grisescens Morawitz, 1875
- M. guaranitica Schrottky, 1908
- M. guayaqui Schrottky, 1913
- M. guineae Strand, 1912

== H ==
- M. habilis Mitchell, 1930
- M. habropodoides Meade-Waldo, 1912
- M. hackeri Cockerell, 1913
- M. haematogastra Cockerell, 1921
- M. haematoxylonae Mitchell, 1930
- M. hamata Mitchell, 1930
- M. hamatipes Cockerell, 1923
- M. hampsoni Cockerell, 1906
- M. hardyi Cockerell, 1929
- M. harrarensis Friese, 1915
- M. haryanaensis Rahman & Chopra, 1994
- M. haryanensis Sharma, Simlote & Gupta, 1993
- M. hecate Vachal, 1903
- M. hei Wu, 2005
- M. heinii Kohl, 1906
- M. heinrichi (Tkalcu, 1979)
- M. heliophila Cockerell, 1913
- M. hemirhodura Cockerell, 1937
- M. henrici Cockerell, 1907
- M. hera Bingham, 1897
- M. heriadiformis Smith, 1853
- M. hertlei Friese, 1911
- M. heteroptera Sichel, 1867
- M. heterotrichia Cameron, 1909
- M. hieronymi Friese, 1906
- M. hilata Mitchell, 1934
- M. hilli Cockerell, 1929
- M. hirsuta Morawitz, 1893
- M. hirsutula Pasteels, 1973
- M. hirticauda Cockerell, 1937
- M. hisarensis Rahman & Chopra, 1994
- M. hisarica Engel, 2017
- M. hoffmanseggiae Jörgensen, 1912
- M. hohmanni Tkalcu, 1993
- M. holmbergi Jörgensen, 1912
- M. holomelaena Cockerell, 1917
- M. holorhodura (Cockerell, 1933)
- M. holosericea (Fabricius, 1793)
- M. holostoma Cockerell, 1937
- M. hookeri Cockerell, 1915
- M. horatii Cockerell, 1913
- M. horrida Schulten, 1977
- M. huascari Cockerell, 1912
- M. hubeiensis Wu, 2005
- M. humilis Smith, 1879
- M. hungarica Mocsáry, 1877
- M. hypoleuca Cockerell, 1927
- M. hypopyrrha Cockerell, 1937

== I ==
- M. ianthoptera Smith, 1853
- M. ichnusae Rebmann, 1968
- M. ignava Mitchell, 1930
- M. ignescens Cockerell, 1929
- M. igniscopata Cockerell, 1911
- M. ignita Smith, 1853
- M. iheringi Schrottky, 1913
- M. ikuthaensis Friese, 1903
- M. illustris Mitchell, 1930
- M. imitata Smith, 1853
- M. immanis Mitchell, 1930
- M. impartita Mitchell, 1934
- M. imperialis Friese, 1903
- M. impressa Friese, 1903
- M. impudens Mitchell, 1930
- M. incana Friese, 1898
- M. incerta Radoszkowski 1876
- M. incisa Smith, 1858
- M. indica (Gupta, 1988)
- M. indica (Gupta, 1990) (Homonym)
- M. indigoferae Mitchell, 1930
- M. indonesica (Engel and Schwarz, 2011)
- M. inermis Provancher, 1888
- M. inexpectata Pasteels, 1973
- M. inexspectata Rebmann, 1968
- M. infima Vachal, 1908
- M. infinita Mitchell, 1930
- M. inflaticauda Cockerell, 1939
- M. ingens Friese, 1903
- M. ingenua Cresson, 1878
- M. inimica Cresson, 1872
- M. innupta Cockerell, 1915
- M. inquirenda Schrottky, 1913
- M. inscita Mitchell, 1930
- M. insignis van der Zanden, 1996
- M. insolens Mitchell, 1930
- M. insolita (Pasteels, 1965)
- M. instita Mitchell, 1934
- M. insularis Smith, 1859
- M. integra Cresson, 1878
- M. integrella Mitchell, 1926
- M. intermixta Gerstaecker, 1869
- M. invenita (Pasteels, 1965)
- M. inyoensis Mitchell, 1942
- M. iranica Rebmann, 1970
- M. irritans Smith, 1879
- M. itapuae Schrottky, 1908
- M. ituriana Cockerell, 1935
- M. ituriella Pasteels, 1965
- M. ivonensis Cockerell, 1927
- M. izucara Cresson, 1878

== J-K ==
- M. jakesi Tkalcu, 1988
- M. jamaicae (Raw, 1984)
- M. janthopteriana Strand, 1911
- M. japonibia Strand, 1910
- M. japonica Alfken, 1903
- M. jeanneli Benoist, 1934
- M. jenseni Friese, 1906
- M. jerryrozeni Genaro, 2003
- M. joergenseni Friese, 1908
- M. johannis Friese, 1922
- M. joseana Friese, 1917
- M. judaea Tkalcu, 1999
- M. junodi Friese, 1904
- M. kakadui (King, 1994)
- M. kalina Gonzalez, Griswold & Engel, 2018
- M. kamerunensis Friese, 1922
- M. kandyca Friese, 1918
- M. karatauensis (Tkalcu, 1988)
- M. karooensis (Brauns, 1912)
- M. kartaboensis Mitchell, 1930
- M. kashmirensis (Tkalcu, 1988)
- M. kasiana (Pasteels, 1965)
- M. katonana Strand, 1911
- M. kelnerae Pasteels, 1978
- M. khamana Cockerell, 1938
- M. kigonserana Friese, 1903
- M. kimilolana Cockerell, 1931
- M. kirbiella Rayment, 1935
- M. kirbyana Cockerell, 1906
- M. kobensis Cockerell, 1918
- M. kohtaoensis Cockerell, 1927
- M. kommai Nagase, 2017
- M. konowiana Friese, 1903
- M. kruegeri Friese, 1923
- M. kuehni Friese, 1903
- M. kununurrensis (King, 1994)
- M. kurandensis Cockerell, 1910
- M. kuschei Cockerell, 1939
- M. kyotensis Alfken, 1931

== L ==
- M. labascens Cockerell, 1925
- M. laboriosa Smith, 1862
- M. ladacensis Cockerell, 1911
- M. ladakhensis (Tkalcu, 1988)
- M. laeta Smith, 1853
- M. laevinasis Vachal, 1904
- M. lagopoda (Linnaeus, 1761)
- M. laguniana Mitchell, 1937
- M. laminata Friese, 1903
- M. laminopeds Wu, 2005
- M. lamnula Vachal, 1908
- M. lanata (Fabricius, 1775)
- M. lanigera Alfken, 1933
- M. lapponica Thomson, 1872
- M. larochei Tkalcu, 1994
- M. latericauda Cockerell, 1921
- M. lateritia Smith, 1858
- M. laticeps Smith, 1853
- M. laticincta Cockerell, 1936
- M. latimanus Say, 1823
- M. latita Mitchell, 1934
- M. lativentris Friese, 1903
- M. latula Vachal, 1908
- M. laurita Mitchell, 1927
- M. leachella Curtis, 1828
- M. leeuwinensis Meade-Waldo, 1915
- M. lefebvrei (Lepeletier, 1841)
- M. lefroma Cameron, 1907
- M. legalis Cresson, 1879
- M. lenticula Vachal, 1908
- M. lentifera Vachal, 1909
- M. leonum Cockerell, 1930
- M. lerma Cameron, 1908
- M. leucografa Friese, 1908
- M. leucomalla Gerstaecker, 1869
- M. leucopogon Cockerell, 1929
- M. leucopogonata (Dours, 1873)
- M. leucopogonites Moure, 1944
- M. leucopsis Schletterer, 1891
- M. leucopyga Smith, 1853
- M. leucospila Cockerell, 1933
- M. leucostomella Cockerell, 1927
- M. levilimba Vachal, 1908
- M. ligniseca (Kirby, 1802)
- M. limata Vachal, 1908
- M. lineatipes Cockerell, 1910
- M. lineatula Cockerell, 1937
- M. lineofasciata (Pasteels, 1965)
- M. lingulata Vachal, 1908
- M. lippiae Cockerell, 1900
- M. lobatifrons Cockerell, 1924
- M. lobicauda Cockerell, 1931
- M. lobitarsis Smith, 1879
- M. longiceps Meade-Waldo, 1915
- M. longuisetosa Gonzalez & Griswold, 2007
- M. lorentzi Friese, 1911
- M. lorenziensis Mitchell, 1930
- M. louisae Brauns, 1926
- M. luangwae Meade-Waldo, 1913
- M. lucidifrons Ferton, 1905
- M. lucidiventris Smith, 1853
- M. lucifer Prendergast, 2025
- M. luctifera Spinola, 1841
- M. luederwaldti Schrottky, 1913
- M. luteiceps Friese, 1911
- M. luteicornis Pasteels, 1973
- M. luteipes Friese, 1908
- M. luteoalba Pasteels, 1973
- M. luteociliata Pasteels, 1965
- M. luteohirta Pasteels, 1973
- M. lutescens Cockerell, 1931

== M ==
- M. maackii Radoszkowski 1874
- M. mabirensis Cockerell, 1937
- M. mackayensis Cockerell, 1910
- M. macleayi Cockerell, 1907
- M. macneilli Mitchell, 1957
- M. maculariformis Cockerell, 1907
- M. macularis Dalla Torre, 1896
- M. maculata Smith, 1853
- M. maculosella Pasteels, 1965
- M. magadiensis Cockerell, 1937
- M. malangensis Friese, 1904
- M. malayana Cameron, 1901
- M. malimbana Strand, 1911
- M. manaosensis Schrottky, 1913
- M. manchuriana Yasumatsu, 1939
- M. mandibularis Morawitz, 1875
- M. manguna Strand, 1911
- M. manicata Giraud, 1861
- M. manifesta Cresson, 1878
- M. manni Mitchell, 1934
- M. manyara Eardley & R. P. Urban, 2006
- M. marginata Smith, 1853
- M. marina Friese, 1911
- M. maritima (Kirby, 1802)
- M. marshalli Friese, 1904
- M. mastrucatella Strand, 1911
- M. matsumurai Hirashima & Maeta, 1974
- M. maurata Mitchell, 1936
- M. mauritaniae (Tkalcu, 1992)
- M. mavromoustakisi van der Zanden, 1992
- M. maxillosa Guérin-Méneville, 1845
- M. mcnamarae Cockerell, 1929
- M. meadewaldoi Brauns, 1912
- M. mediana (Pasteels, 1965)
- M. mediorufa Cockerell, 1930
- M. mefistofelica Gribodo, 1894
- M. megachiloides (Alfken, 1942)
- M. melancholica Jörgensen, 1912
- M. melanderi Mitchell, 1944
- M. melanogaster Eversmann, 1852
- M. melanophaea Smith, 1853
- M. melanops Cockerell, 1937
- M. melanopyga Costa, 1863
- M. melanota Pérez, 1895
- M. melanotricha Spinola, 1851
- M. mellitarsis Cresson, 1878
- M. memecylonae (Engel, 2011)
- M. mendanae Cockerell, 1911
- M. mendica Cresson, 1878
- M. mendocensis Durante, Abramovich & Lucia, 2006
- M. mendozana Cockerell, 1907
- M. meneliki Friese, 1915
- M. merrilli Cockerell, 1918
- M. mertoni Friese, 1903
- M. meruensis Friese, 1909
- M. metallescens Cockerell, 1918
- M. michaelis Cockerell, 1931
- M. micheneri Mitchell, 1936
- M. micrerythrura Cockerell, 1910
- M. microdontura Cockerell, 1927
- M. microsoma Cockerell, 1912
- M. mimetica Cockerell, 1933
- M. mimeticana Eardley & R. P. Urban, 2006
- M. minima Ashmead, 1900
- M. minor Vachal, 1908
- M. minutissima Radoszkowski 1876
- M. minutula Friese, 1911
- M. minutuloides Alfken, 1936
- M. miranda Vachal, 1904
- M. mitchelli Raw, 2004
- M. mixtura Eardley & R. P. Urban, 2005
- M. mlanjensis Meade-Waldo, 1913
- M. mlunguziensis Schulten, 1977
- M. mobilis Mitchell, 1930
- M. moderata Smith, 1879
- M. modesta Smith, 1862
- M. moelleri Bingham, 1897
- M. moera Cameron, 1902
- M. mojavensis Mitchell, 1934
- M. mongoliae (Tkalcu, 1988)
- M. mongolica Morawitz, 1890
- M. monkmani Rayment, 1935
- M. monstrifica Morawitz, 1878
- M. monstrosa Smith, 1868
- M. montenegrensis Dours, 1873
- M. montezuma Cresson, 1878
- M. montibia Strand, 1911
- M. monticola Smith, 1853
- M. montivaga Cresson, 1878
- M. montonii Gribodo, 1894
- M. morawitzi Radoszkowski 1886
- M. morio Smith, 1853
- M. morsitans Saussure, 1890
- M. mortyana Dalla Torre, 1896
- M. mossambica Gribodo, 1895
- M. moureana Silveira et al., 2002
- M. muansae Friese, 1911
- M. mucida Cresson, 1878
- M. mucorea Friese, 1898
- M. mucorosa Cockerell, 1908
- M. multidens Fox, 1891
- M. multispinosa Morawitz, 1875
- M. mundifica Cockerell, 1921
- M. murina Friese, 1913
- M. musculus Friese, 1913
- M. mutala Strand, 1912
- M. mystacea (Fabricius, 1775)
- M. mystaceana (Michener, 1962)

== N ==
- M. naevia Kohl, 1906
- M. namibensis Eardley, 2012
- M. nana Bingham, 1897
- M. nasalis Smith, 1879
- M. nasica Morawitz, 1880
- M. nasicornis Friese, 1903
- M. nasidens Friese, 1898
- M. natansiella Cockerell, 1944
- M. navicularis Cockerell, 1918
- M. neavei Vachal, 1910
- M. nelsoni Mitchell, 1936
- M. nematocera Cockerell, 1929
- M. neoxanthoptera Cockerell, 1933
- M. neutra Vachal, 1908
- M. nevadensis Cresson, 1879
- M. newberryae Cockerell, 1900
- M. nidulator Smith, 1864
- M. nigella Vachal, 1908
- M. nigeriensis Cockerell, 1937
- M. nigra Schulten, 1977
- M. nigribarbis Vachal, 1909
- M. nigricans Cameron, 1898
- M. nigriceps Friese, 1903
- M. nigrimanus Schulten, 1977
- M. nigripennis Spinola, 1841
- M. nigripes Spinola, 1838
- M. nigripollex Vachal, 1910
- M. nigrita Radoszkowski 1876
- M. nigriventris Schenck, 1870
- M. nigroalba Friese, 1920
- M. nigroapicalis Wu, 2005
- M. nigroaurea Pasteels, 1965
- M. nigrocaudata Friese, 1903
- M. nigrofulva Hedicke, 1940
- M. nigrohirta Friese, 1903
- M. nigromixta Cockerell, 1919
- M. nigropectoralis Wu, 2005
- M. nigropilosa Schrottky, 1902
- M. nigrorufa Pasteels, 1973
- M. nigroscopula Wu, 1982
- M. nigrovittata Cockerell, 1906
- M. nipponica Cockerell, 1914
- M. nitidiscutata Friese, 1920
- M. nivalis Friese, 1903
- M. niveicauda Cockerell, 1931
- M. niveofasciata Friese, 1904
- M. nivescens W. F. Kirby, 1900
- M. nudiventris Smith, 1853
- M. numerus Mitchell, 1930

== O ==
- M. obdurata Mitchell, 1930
- M. obliqua Mitchell, 1930
- M. oblita Vachal, 1908
- M. oblonga Smith, 1879
- M. obrepta Cockerell, 1925
- M. obscurior Jörgensen, 1912
- M. obtusa Smith, 1853
- M. occidentalis Fox, 1894
- M. ocellifera Cockerell, 1918
- M. octosignata Nylander, 1852
- M. oculiformis Rayment, 1956
- M. odontophora (Engel, 2011)
- M. odontostoma Cockerell, 1924
- M. oenotherae (Mitchell, 1924)
- M. okinawana Yasumatsu & Hirashima, 1964
- M. opacifrons Pérez, 1897
- M. opaculina Cockerell, 1937
- M. opifex Smith, 1879
- M. opposita Smith, 1853
- M. orba Schrottky, 1913
- M. orbiculata Mitchell, 1930
- M. orcina Vachal, 1908
- M. ordinaria Smith, 1853
- M. orientalis Morawitz, 1895
- M. ornata Smith, 1853
- M. ornaticoxis Cockerell, 1935
- M. ornithica Cockerell, 1937
- M. orthostoma Cockerell, 1925
- M. osea Cameron, 1902
- M. oslari Mitchell, 1934
- M. othona Cameron, 1901
- M. otomita Cresson, 1878

== P ==
- M. pachyceps Friese, 1922
- M. pagosiana Mitchell, 1934
- M. paisa Gonzalez, Griswold & Engel, 2018
- M. palaestina (Tkalcu, 1988)
- M. palaonica Cockerell, 1939
- M. pallida Radoszkowski, 1881
- M. pallipes Smith, 1879
- M. pallorea Vachal, 1903
- M. palmensis Mitchell, 1934
- M. palmeri Cresson, 1878
- M. pamirensis Cockerell, 1911
- M. pampeana Vachal, 1908
- M. pamperella Vachal, 1908
- M. panda Cockerell, 1931
- M. pankus Bzdyk, 2012
- M. papuae (Michener, 1965)
- M. papuana Cockerell, 1929
- M. parabukamensis (Pasteels, 1965)
- M. paracallida Rayment, 1935
- M. paracantha (Pasteels, 1965)
- M. paraensis Mocsáry, 1887
- M. parallela Smith, 1853
- M. parancinnula Cockerell, 1937
- M. pararhodura Cockerell, 1910
- M. parata Mitchell, 1930
- M. paratasmanica Rayment, 1955
- M. paraxanthura Cockerell, 1914
- M. parietina (Geoffroy, 1785)
- M. parksi Mitchell, 1936
- M. parornata Chatthanabun, Warrit & Ascher, 2020
- M. parsonsiae Schrottky, 1913
- M. pascoensis Mitchell, 1934
- M. pasteelsi (van der Zanden, 1998)
- M. patagonica Vachal, 1904
- M. patellimana Spinola, 1838
- M. patera (King, 1994)
- M. paucipunctulata W. F. Kirby, 1900
- M. pauliani Benoist, 1950
- M. paulista (Schrottky, 1920)
- M. paulistana Schrottky, 1902
- M. paupera Pasteels, 1965
- M. peculifera Cockerell, 1919
- M. pedalis Fox, 1891
- M. penetrata Smith, 1879
- M. perezi Mocsáry, 1887
- M. pereziana Dalla Torre, 1896
- M. perfimbriata Cockerell, 1931
- M. perihirta Cockerell, 1898
- M. permunda Cockerell, 1912
- M. perniciosa Friese, 1903
- M. perochracea Cockerell, 1913
- M. perplexa Smith, 1853
- M. perpunctata Cockerell, 1896
- M. persimilis Cockerell, 1937
- M. perspicua Mitchell, 1930
- M. peruviana Smith, 1879
- M. petulans Cresson, 1878
- M. pexa Rebmann, 1968
- M. phaola Cameron, 1907
- M. phaseoli Moure, 1977
- M. phenacopyga Cockerell, 1910
- M. philinca Cockerell, 1912
- M. philippinensis Friese, 1916
- M. phillipensis Rayment, 1935
- M. picicaudata Raw, 2007
- M. picicornis Morawitz, 1853
- M. pictiventris Smith, 1879
- M. piliceps Saussure, 1890
- M. pilicrus Morawitz, 1877
- M. pilidens Alfken, 1924
- M. piliventris Morawitz, 1886
- M. pillaultae Pasteels, 1978
- M. pilosa Smith, 1879
- M. pilosella Friese, 1922
- M. pinguicula Pasteels, 1965
- M. pinguiventris Pasteels, 1965
- M. pipunctulata (Pasteels, 1965)
- M. piurensis Cockerell, 1911
- M. placida Smith, 1862
- M. planula Vachal, 1908
- M. platystoma Pasteels, 1965
- M. plesiosoma (Cockerell, 1935)
- M. pleuralis Vachal, 1908
- M. plumata Wu, 2005
- M. pluto Smith, 1860
- M. poeyi Guérin-Méneville, 1845
- M. policaris Say, 1831
- M. pollinosa Spinola, 1851
- M. polychroma Cockerell, 1937
- M. pontica (Alfken, 1933)
- M. portalis Cockerell, 1913
- M. portlandiana Rayment, 1953
- M. postnigra Cockerell, 1937
- M. povolnyi (Tkalcu, 1969)
- M. praecipua Mitchell, 1930
- M. praefica Gribodo, 1894
- M. praetexta Vachal, 1910
- M. preissi Cockerell, 1910
- M. pretiosa Friese, 1909
- M. privigna Rebmann, 1968
- M. propinqua Cockerell, 1913
- M. prosopidis Cockerell, 1900
- M. prudens Mitchell, 1930
- M. pruina Smith, 1853
- M. pruinosa Pérez, 1897
- M. psenopogoniaea Moure, 1948
- M. pseudanthidioides Moure, 1943
- M. pseudobrevis Mitchell, 1936[1]
- M. pseudocincta (Pasteels, 1970)
- M. pseudofulva (Pasteels, 1965)
- M. pseudolaminata (Pasteels, 1965)
- M. pseudolegalis Mitchell, 1957
- M. pseudomonticola Hedicke, 1925
- M. pseudonigra Mitchell, 1927
- M. pseudopleuralis Schrottky, 1913
- M. pseudotaraxis Eardley, 2012
- M. pugillatoria Costa, 1863
- M. pugnata Say, 1837
- M. pulchra Smith, 1879
- M. pulchrifrons Cockerell, 1933
- M. pulchriventris Cockerell, 1923
- M. pullata Smith, 1879
- M. pulvinata Vachal, 1910
- M. punctata Smith, 1853
- M. punctatissima Spinola, 1806
- M. puncticollis Friese, 1903
- M. punctolineata Cockerell, 1934
- M. punctomarginata Schulten, 1977
- M. pusilla Pérez, 1884
- M. pyrenaea Pérez, 1890
- M. pyrenaica Lepeletier, 1841
- M. pyrrhogastra Cockerell, 1913
- M. pyrrhothorax Schletterer, 1891
- M. pyrrotricha Cockerell, 1913

== Q ==
- M. quadrata Vachal, 1909
- M. quadraticauda (Pasteels, 1965)
- M. quadridentata Mitchell, 1930
- M. quadrispinosella Strand, 1910
- M. quartinae Gribodo, 1884
- M. quinquelineata Cockerell, 1906

== R ==
- M. ramakrishnae Cockerell, 1919
- M. rambutwan Cheesman, 1936
- M. ramera Cockerell, 1918
- M. ramulipes Cockerell, 1913
- M. rancaguensis Friese, 1905
- M. rangii Cheesman, 1936
- M. rava Vachal, 1908
- M. rawi Engel, 1999
- M. recisa Cockerell, 1913
- M. recta Mitchell, 1930
- M. rectipalma Vachal, 1909
- M. redondensis Mitchell, 1930
- M. reepeni Friese, 1918
- M. reflexa (Snelling, 1990)
- M. regina Friese, 1903
- M. reicherti Brauns, 1929
- M. relata Smith, 1879
- M. relativa Cresson, 1878
- M. relicta Cockerell, 1913
- M. remeata Cockerell, 1913
- M. remigata Vachal, 1908
- M. remota Smith, 1879
- M. remotissima Cockerell, 1926
- M. remotula Cockerell, 1910
- M. resinifera Meade-Waldo, 1915
- M. revicta Cockerell, 1913
- M. rhinoceros Mocsáry, 1892
- M. rhododendri Cockerell, 1927
- M. rhodogastra Cockerell, 1910
- M. rhodopus Cockerell, 1896
- M. rhodosiaca Rebmann, 1972
- M. rhodura Cockerell, 1906
- M. rhyssalus Wu, 2005
- M. richtersveldensis Eardley, 2012
- M. riggenbachiana Strand, 1911
- M. riojana Schrottky, 1920
- M. riojanensis Mitchell, 1930
- M. riomii (Pasteels, 1970)
- M. rixator Cockerell, 1911
- M. riyadhensis (Alqarni, Hannan, Gonzalez, and Engel, 2012)
- M. roepkei Friese, 1914
- M. roeweri (Alfken, 1927)
- M. rosarum Cockerell, 1931
- M. rossi Mitchell, 1943
- M. rottnestensis Rayment, 1934
- M. rotundata (Fabricius, 1793)
- M. rotundiceps Smith, 1857
- M. rotundipennis W. F. Kirby, 1900
- M. rotundiventris Perris, 1852
- M. rowlandi Cockerell, 1930
- M. rubi Mitchell, 1924
- M. rubicunda Smith, 1879
- M. rubricata Smith, 1853
- M. rubricrus Moure, 1948
- M. rubrigena (Pasteels, 1965)
- M. rubrimana Morawitz, 1893
- M. rubripes Morawitz, 1875
- M. rubriventris Smith, 1879
- M. rubtzovi Cockerell, 1928
- M. ruda (Pasteels, 1965)
- M. rufa Friese, 1903
- M. rufescens Pérez, 1879
- M. ruficeps Friese, 1903
- M. ruficheloides Strand, 1911
- M. ruficornis Smith, 1853
- M. rufigaster Cockerell, 1945
- M. rufipennis (Fabricius, 1793)
- M. rufipes (Fabricius, 1781)
- M. rufiplantis Vachal, 1904
- M. rufiscopa Saussure, 1890
- M. rufitarsis (Lepeletier, 1841)
- M. rufiventris Guérin-Méneville, 1834
- M. rufobarbata Cockerell, 1936
- M. rufocaudata Friese, 1903
- M. rufofulva Cockerell, 1918
- M. rufohirtula Cockerell, 1937
- M. rufolobata Cockerell, 1913
- M. rufomaculata Rayment, 1935
- M. rufopilosa Friese, 1911
- M. rufoscopacaea Friese, 1903
- M. rufovittata Cockerell, 1911
- M. rugicollis Friese, 1903
- M. rugifrons (Smith, 1854)
- M. rugosa Smith, 1879
- M. rupshuensis Cockerell, 1911

== S ==
- M. saba Strand, 1914
- M. sabinensis Mitchell, 1934
- M. saganeitana Gribodo, 1894
- M. saigonensis Cockerell, 1920
- M. salsburyana Friese, 1922
- M. sandacana Cockerell, 1919
- M. santacrucensis Durante, Abramovich & Lucia, 2006
- M. santaerosae Strand, 1910
- M. santaremensis Mitchell, 1930
- M. santiaguensis Durante, 1996
- M. sarahae Eardley, 2012
- M. saulcyi Guérin-Méneville, 1845
- M. saussurei Radoszkowski 1874
- M. sauteri Hedicke, 1940
- M. scheviakovi Cockerell, 1928
- M. schmidti Friese, 1917
- M. schmiedeknechti Costa, 1884
- M. schulthessi Friese, 1903
- M. schwimmeri Engel, 2017
- M. scindularia Buysson, 1903
- M. sculpturalis Smith, 1853
- M. scutellata Smith, 1879
- M. seducta Mitchell, 1934
- M. sedula Smith, 1879
- M. seewaldi Strand, 1911
- M. sefrensis Benoist, 1943
- M. sejuncta Cockerell, 1927
- M. selenostoma Cockerell, 1931
- M. semibarbata Cockerell, 1937
- M. semicandens Cockerell, 1910
- M. semicircularis van der Zanden, 1996
- M. semiclara Cockerell, 1929
- M. semicognata Cockerell, 1937
- M. semierma Vachal, 1903
- M. semilaurita Mitchell, 1927
- M. semiluctuosa Smith, 1853
- M. semipleta Cockerell, 1921
- M. semirufa Sichel, 1867
- M. semivestita (Smith, 1853)
- M. semota Cockerell, 1927
- M. senex Smith, 1853
- M. septentrionella Pasteels, 1965
- M. sequior Cockerell, 1910
- M. seraxensis Radoszkowski 1893
- M. sericans Fonscolombe, 1852
- M. sericeicauda Cockerell, 1910
- M. serraticauda Cockerell, 1938
- M. serricauda Cockerell, 1910
- M. serrigera Cockerell, 1937
- M. setosa Vachal, 1909
- M. sexmaculata Smith, 1868
- M. seychellensis Cameron, 1907
- M. sheppardi (Pasteels, 1965)
- M. shortlandi Cockerell, 1911
- M. siamensis Cockerell, 1927
- M. sicheli Friese, 1903
- M. sicula (Rossi, 1792)
- M. sidalceae Cockerell, 1897
- M. sikkimi Radoszkowski 1882
- M. sikorae Friese, 1900
- M. silvapis Wu, 2005
- M. silverlocki Meade-Waldo, 1913
- M. silvestris Rayment, 1951
- M. similis Smith, 1879
- M. simillima Smith, 1853
- M. simlaensis Cameron, 1909
- M. simonyi Friese, 1903
- M. simplex Smith, 1853
- M. simpliciformis Cockerell, 1918
- M. simplicipes Friese, 1921
- M. simulator Cockerell, 1937
- M. sinensis (Wu, 1985)
- M. singularis Cresson, 1865
- M. sinuata Friese, 1903
- M. slevini Cockerell, 1924
- M. soledadensis Cockerell, 1900
- M. sonorana Cockerell, 1924
- M. sosia (Pasteels, 1970)
- M. soutpansbergensis Eardley, 2012
- M. speluncarum Meade-Waldo, 1915
- M. sphenapis Wu, 2005
- M. spinosiventris Pasteels, 1965
- M. spinotulata Mitchell, 1934
- M. spissula Cockerell, 1911
- M. squalens Haliday, 1836
- M. squamosa Rebmann, 1970
- M. staudingeri Friese, 1905
- M. stefenellii Friese, 1903
- M. steinbachi Friese, 1906
- M. stenodesma Schrottky, 1913
- M. sterilis Mitchell, 1930
- M. sternintegra (Pasteels, 1965)
- M. stilbonotaspis Moure, 1945
- M. stirostoma Cameron, 1913
- M. stoddardensis Mitchell, 1957
- M. stolzmanni Radoszkowski 1893
- M. stomatura Cockerell, 1917
- M. strandi (Popov, 1936)
- M. strangei (Gonzalez & Engel, 2012)
- M. strenua Smith, 1879
- M. striatella Rebmann, 1968
- M. striatula (Cockerell, 1931)
- M. strigata Vachal, 1904
- M. structilis Cockerell, 1918
- M. strupigera Cockerell, 1922
- M. stulta Bingham, 1897
- M. subalbuta Yasumatsu, 1936
- M. subanograe Mitchell, 1934
- M. subatrella Rayment, 1939
- M. subcingulata Moure, 1945
- M. subexilis Cockerell, 1908
- M. subferox Meade-Waldo, 1915
- M. sublaurita Mitchell, 1927
- M. submetallica Benoist, 1955
- M. submucida Alfken, 1926
- M. subnigra Cresson, 1879
- M. subpallens Vachal, 1908
- M. subparallela Mitchell, 1944
- M. subremotula Rayment, 1934
- M. subrixator Cockerell, 1915
- M. subsericeicauda Rayment, 1939
- M. subserricauda Rayment, 1935
- M. subtranquilla Yasumatsu, 1938
- M. sudanica Magretti, 1898
- M. suffusipennis Cockerell, 1906
- M. sumatrana Friese, 1918
- M. sumichrasti Cresson, 1878
- M. sumizome Hirashima & Maeta, 1974
- M. suspecta Vachal, 1909
- M. susurrans Haliday, 1836
- M. swarbrecki Rayment, 1946
- M. syraensis Radoszkowski 1874
- M. szentivanyi (Michener, 1965)

== T ==
- M. tabayensis Schrottky, 1920
- M. taftanica Engel, 2017
- M. taiwanicola Yasumatsu & Hirashima, 1965
- M. takaoensis Cockerell, 1911
- M. tamilensis (Gupta, 1991)
- M. tangensis Cockerell, 1937
- M. tantilla Cockerell, 1937
- M. tapytensis Mitchell, 1929
- M. taraxis Eardley, 2012
- M. tarea Cameron, 1902
- M. tarsatula Cockerell, 1915
- M. tarsatulata Cockerell, 1916
- M. tasmanica Cockerell, 1916
- M. taua Strand, 1911
- M. tecta Radoszkowski 1888
- M. temora Cameron, 1905
- M. tenorai (Tkalcu, 1969)
- M. tenuicincta Cockerell, 1929
- M. tenuitarsis Schrottky, 1920
- M. tepaneca Cresson, 1878
- M. terminalis Smith, 1858
- M. terminata Morawitz, 1875
- M. terrestris Schrottky, 1902
- M. tertia Dalla Torre, 1896
- M. tessmanni Pasteels, 1965
- M. tetracantha Cockerell, 1937
- M. tetrazona Friese, 1908
- M. tetrodonta Pasteels, 1965
- M. texana Cresson, 1878
- M. texensis Mitchell, 1956
- M. thoracica Smith, 1853
- M. thygaterella Schrottky, 1913
- M. tiburonensis Cockerell, 1924
- M. timberlakei Cockerell, 1920
- M. timida Mitchell, 1930
- M. timorensis Friese, 1918
- M. tkalcui van der Zanden, 1996
- M. toluca Cresson, 1878
- M. tomentosa Friese, 1903
- M. torrida Smith, 1853
- M. toscata Mitchell, 1934
- M. tosticauda Cockerell, 1912
- M. townsendiana Cockerell, 1898
- M. toxopei Alfken, 1926
- M. tranquilla Cockerell, 1911
- M. transgrediens Rebmann, 1970
- M. transiens (Pasteels, 1965)
- M. trapezicauda Pasteels, 1965
- M. trepida Mitchell, 1930
- M. tributa Vachal, 1909
- M. trichorhytisma Engel, 2006
- M. trichroma Friese, 1922
- M. trichrootricha Moure, 1953
- M. tricolor (Pasteels, 1970)
- M. tridentata Ashmead, 1900
- M. trigonaspis Schrottky, 1913
- M. trisecta (Pasteels, 1976)
- M. tritacantha (Pasteels, 1970)
- M. trizonata Wu, 2005
- M. trochantina Vachal, 1909
- M. troodica Mavromoustakis, 1953
- M. trucis Mitchell, 1930
- M. truncata Friese, 1903
- M. truncaticauda Cockerell, 1933
- M. truncaticeps Friese, 1909
- M. trusanica (Engel, 2011)
- M. tsimbazazae (Pauly, 2001)
- M. tsingtauensis Strand, 1915
- M. tsurugensis Cockerell, 1924
- M. tuberculata Smith, 1857
- M. tuberculifera Schrottky, 1913
- M. tuberculosa Dalla Torre, 1896
- M. tucumana Vachal, 1908
- M. tulariana Mitchell, 1937
- M. tupinaquina Schrottky, 1913
- M. turbulenta Mitchell, 1930
- M. turneri (Meade-Waldo, 1913)
- M. turpis Mitchell, 1930
- M. tutuilae Perkins & Cheesman, 1928

== U-V ==
- M. uamiella Pasteels, 1965
- M. ulrica Nurse, 1901
- M. umatillensis (Mitchell, 1927)
- M. umbripennis Smith, 1853
- M. una Vachal, 1909
- M. uncinata Gonzalez, Griswold & Engel 2018
- M. ungulata Smith, 1853
- M. unifasciata Radoszkowski 1881
- M. urbana Smith, 1879
- M. ustulata Smith, 1862
- M. utra Vachal, 1903
- M. vachali (Pasteels, 1965)
- M. vagata Vachal, 1908
- M. valdezi Cockerell, 1916
- M. valida Smith, 1879
- M. vandeveldii (Meunier, 1888)
- M. vanduzeei Cockerell, 1924
- M. variabilis (King, 1994)
- M. varipes Vachal, 1908
- M. variplantis Vachal, 1909
- M. variscopa Pérez, 1895
- M. variscopula Cockerell, 1931
- M. velutina Smith, 1853
- M. ventralis Smith, 1860
- M. venusta Smith, 1853
- M. veraecrucis Cockerell, 1896
- M. verrucosa Brèthes, 1910
- M. versicolor Smith, 1844
- M. vestis Mitchell, 1930
- M. vestita Smith, 1853
- M. vestitor Cockerell, 1910
- M. veterna Vachal, 1908
- M. vetula Vachal, 1904
- M. viator Mitchell, 1930
- M. victoriana Mitchell, 1934
- M. vigilans Smith, 1878
- M. villipes Morawitz, 1875
- M. villosa (Fabricius, 1775)
- M. virescens Cockerell, 1912
- M. viridicollis Morawitz, 1875
- M. viridinitens Cockerell, 1930
- M. vitraci Pérez, 1884
- M. voiensis Cockerell, 1937
- M. vulpina Friese, 1913
- M. vulpinella Pasteels, 1973

== W-Z ==
- M. wagenknechti Ruiz, 1936
- M. wahlbergi Friese, 1901
- M. walkeri Dalla Torre, 1896
- M. waterhousei Cockerell, 1906
- M. wfkirbyi Kohl, 1906
- M. wheeleri Mitchell, 1927
- M. whiteana Cameron, 1905
- M. willowmorensis Brauns, 1926
- M. willughbiella (Kirby, 1802)
- M. wilmattae Cockerell, 1924
- M. woodfordi Cockerell, 1911
- M. wyndhamensis Rayment, 1935
- M. wyomingensis Mitchell, 1934
- M. xanthothrix Yasumatsu & Hirashima, 1964
- M. xanthura Spinola, 1853
- M. xerophila Cockerell, 1933
- M. xylocopoides Smith, 1853
- M. yaeyamaensis Yasumatsu & Hirashima, 1964
- M. yasumatsui Hirashima, 1974
- M. ypiranguensis Schrottky, 1913
- M. yumensis Mitchell, 1944
- M. zambesica Pasteels, 1965 (Homonym)
- M. zapoteca Cresson, 1878
- M. zaptlana Cresson, 1878
- M. zebrella Pasteels, 1973
- M. zernyi Alfken, 1933
- M. zexmeniae Cockerell, 1912
- M. zingowli Cheesman, 1936
- M. zombae Schulten, 1977
- M. zygia Cameron, 1902
