= Megachile jerryrozeni =

Scientific classification
- Domain: Eukaryota
- Kingdom: Animalia
- Phylum: Arthropoda
- Class: Insecta
- Order: Hymenoptera
- Family: Megachilidae
- Genus: Megachile
- Species: M. jerryrozeni

Binomial name
- Megachile jerryrozeni Genaro, 2003

Species of leafcutter bee (Megachile)

Megachile jerryrozeni is a species of bee in the family Megachilidae. It was described by Genaro in 2003.
