= Megachile edwardsi =

Scientific classification
- Domain: Eukaryota
- Kingdom: Animalia
- Phylum: Arthropoda
- Class: Insecta
- Order: Hymenoptera
- Family: Megachilidae
- Genus: Megachile
- Species: M. edwardsi

Binomial name
- Megachile edwardsi Friese, 1922

Synonyms
- Megachile spatulicornis Pasteels, 1973

Species of leafcutter bee (Megachile)

Megachile edwardsi is a species of bee in the family Megachilidae. It was described by Friese in 1922.
