= Megachile luteociliata =

Scientific classification
- Domain: Eukaryota
- Kingdom: Animalia
- Phylum: Arthropoda
- Class: Insecta
- Order: Hymenoptera
- Family: Megachilidae
- Genus: Megachile
- Species: M. luteociliata

Binomial name
- Megachile luteociliata Pasteels, 1965

Species of leafcutter bee (Megachile)

Megachile luteociliata is a species of bee in the family Megachilidae. It was discovered by Pasteels in 1965 in Kenya, describing it as a leaf-cutter bee. The species is only found in Kenya.

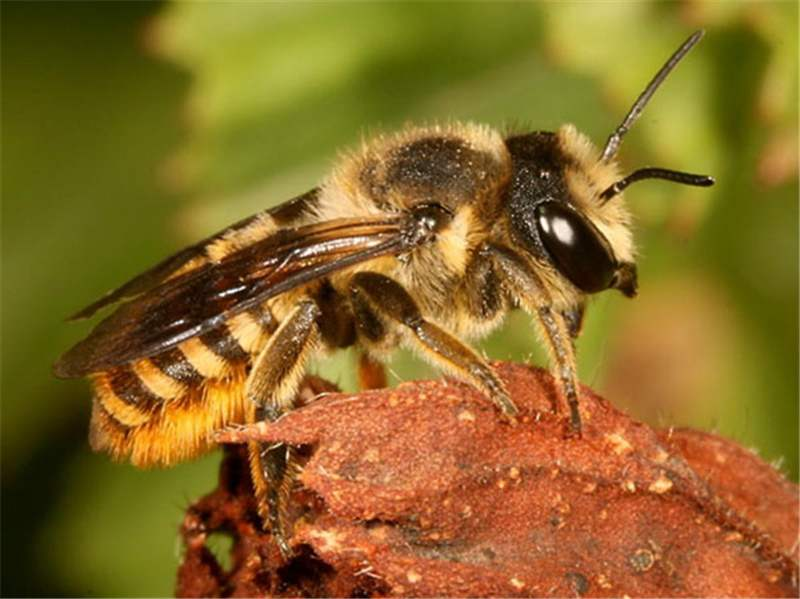
A Megachile bee, closely related to the Luteociliata found in Kenya.
