= Megachile hackeri =

Scientific classification
- Kingdom: Animalia
- Phylum: Arthropoda
- Class: Insecta
- Order: Hymenoptera
- Family: Megachilidae
- Genus: Megachile
- Species: M. hackeri

Binomial name
- Megachile hackeri Cockerell, 1913

Species of leafcutter bee (Megachile)

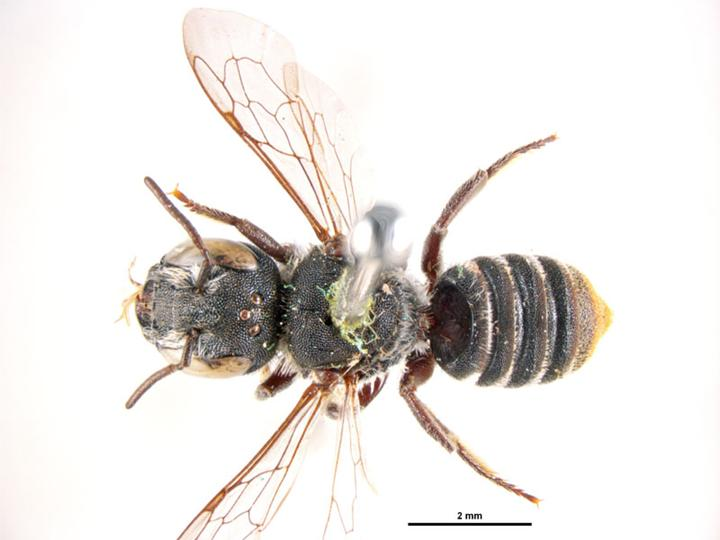
Megachile Hackeri specimen (female)

Megachile hackeri is a species of bee in the family Megachilidae. It was described by Theodore Dru Alison Cockerell in 1913.
