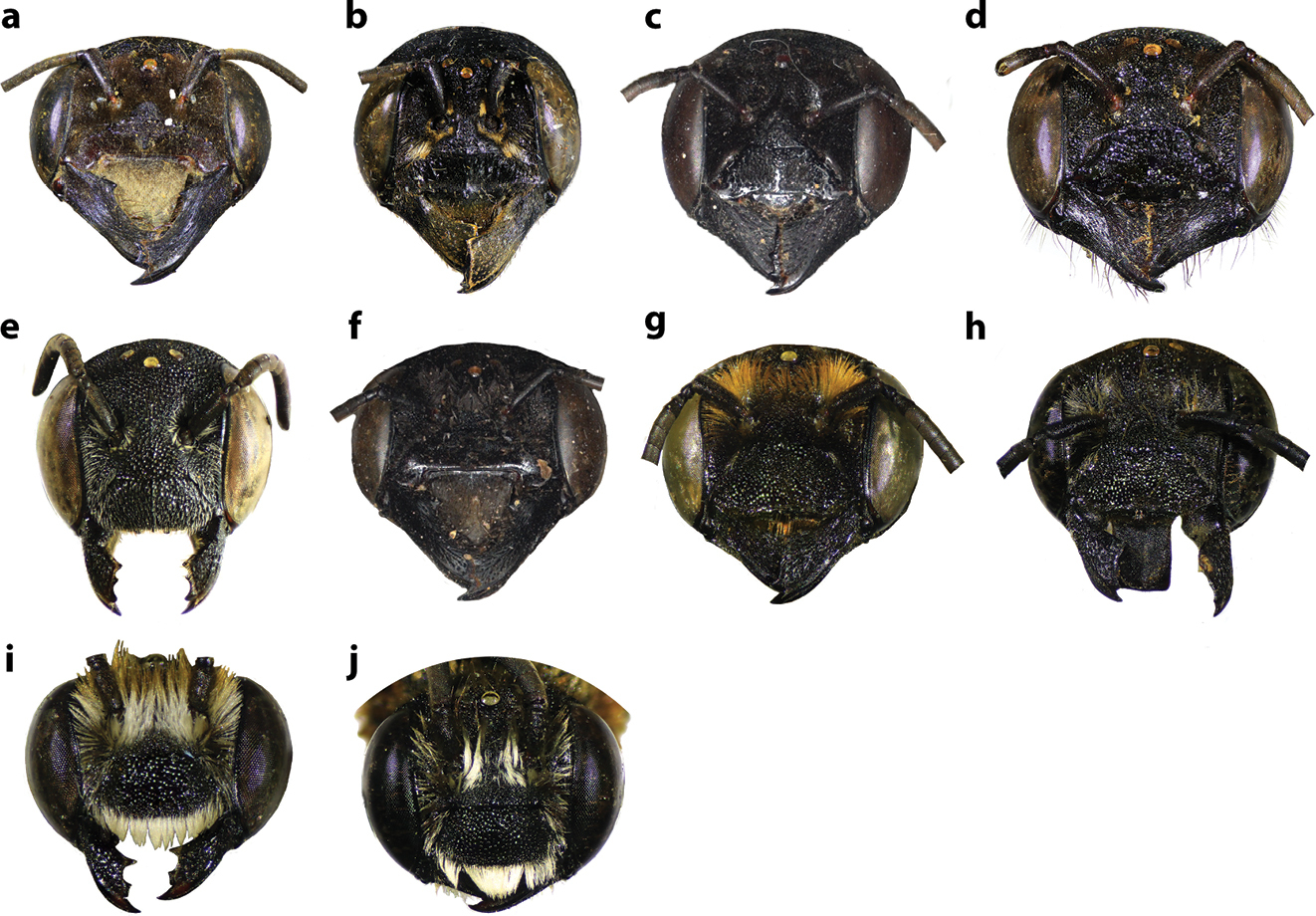

Scientific classification
- Domain: Eukaryota
- Kingdom: Animalia
- Phylum: Arthropoda
- Class: Insecta
- Order: Hymenoptera
- Family: Megachilidae
- Genus: Megachile
- Species: M. tuberculata

Binomial name
- Megachile tuberculata Smith, 1853

Synonyms
- Megachile longipalpis Radoszkowski, 1882

= Megachile tuberculata =

Species of leafcutter bee (Megachile)

Megachile tuberculata is a species of bee in the family Megachilidae. It was described by Smith in 1857, and occurs in SE Asia and Oceania.
