= Megachile bradleyi =

Scientific classification
- Domain: Eukaryota
- Kingdom: Animalia
- Phylum: Arthropoda
- Class: Insecta
- Order: Hymenoptera
- Family: Megachilidae
- Genus: Megachile
- Species: M. bradleyi

Binomial name
- Megachile bradleyi Mitchell, 1934

Species of leafcutter bee (Megachile)

Megachile bradleyi is a species of bee in the family Megachilidae. It was described by Mitchell in 1934.
