= Megachile falcidentata =

Scientific classification
- Domain: Eukaryota
- Kingdom: Animalia
- Phylum: Arthropoda
- Class: Insecta
- Order: Hymenoptera
- Family: Megachilidae
- Genus: Megachile
- Species: M. falcidentata

Binomial name
- Megachile falcidentata Moure & Silveira, 1992

Species of leafcutter bee (Megachile)

Megachile falcidentata is a species of bee in the family Megachilidae. It was described by Moure & Silveira in 1992.
