= Megachile albiscopa =

Scientific classification
- Domain: Eukaryota
- Kingdom: Animalia
- Phylum: Arthropoda
- Class: Insecta
- Order: Hymenoptera
- Family: Megachilidae
- Genus: Megachile
- Species: M. albiscopa

Binomial name
- Megachile albiscopa Saussure, 1890

Species of leafcutter bee (Megachile)

Megachile albiscopa is a species of bee in the family Megachilidae, described by Saussure in 1890.
