= Megachile oculiformis =

Scientific classification
- Kingdom: Animalia
- Phylum: Arthropoda
- Class: Insecta
- Order: Hymenoptera
- Family: Megachilidae
- Genus: Megachile
- Species: M. oculiformis

Binomial name
- Megachile oculiformis Rayment, 1956

Species of leafcutter bee (Megachile)

Megachile oculiformis is a species of bee in the family Megachilidae. It was described by Rayment in 1956.
