= Megachile nigromixta =

Scientific classification
- Domain: Eukaryota
- Kingdom: Animalia
- Phylum: Arthropoda
- Class: Insecta
- Order: Hymenoptera
- Family: Megachilidae
- Genus: Megachile
- Species: M. nigromixta

Binomial name
- Megachile nigromixta Cockerell, 1919

Species of leafcutter bee (Megachile)

Megachile nigromixta is a species of bee in the family Megachilidae. It was described by Theodore Dru Alison Cockerell in 1919.
