= Megachile adeloptera =

Scientific classification
- Domain: Eukaryota
- Kingdom: Animalia
- Phylum: Arthropoda
- Class: Insecta
- Order: Hymenoptera
- Family: Megachilidae
- Genus: Megachile
- Species: M. adeloptera

Binomial name
- Megachile adeloptera Schletterer, 1891

Species of leafcutter bee (Megachile)

Megachile adeloptera is a species of bee in the family Megachilidae. It was described by Schletterer in 1891.
