= Megachile dolichosoma =

Scientific classification
- Domain: Eukaryota
- Kingdom: Animalia
- Phylum: Arthropoda
- Class: Insecta
- Order: Hymenoptera
- Family: Megachilidae
- Genus: Megachile
- Species: M. dolichosoma

Binomial name
- Megachile dolichosoma Benoist, 1962

Species of leafcutter bee (Megachile)

Megachile dolichosoma is a species of bee in the family Megachilidae. It was described by Benoist in 1962.
