= Megachile bucephala =

Scientific classification
- Domain: Eukaryota
- Kingdom: Animalia
- Phylum: Arthropoda
- Class: Insecta
- Order: Hymenoptera
- Family: Megachilidae
- Genus: Megachile
- Species: M. bucephala

Binomial name
- Megachile bucephala (Fabricius, 1793)

Synonyms
- Apis bucephala Fabricius, 1793; Megachile flavescens Friese, 1904; Megachile melliferina Cockerell, 1916; Megachile semifulva Friese, 1922; Megachile planatipes Cockerell, 1933; Megachile pogonognatha Cockerell, 1935; Megachile (Eurymella) flavopilosa Pasteels, 1965

Species of leafcutter bee (Megachile)

Megachile bucephala is a species of bee in the family Megachilidae. It was described by Johan Christian Fabricius in 1793.
