= Megachile patellimana =

Scientific classification
- Domain: Eukaryota
- Kingdom: Animalia
- Phylum: Arthropoda
- Class: Insecta
- Order: Hymenoptera
- Family: Megachilidae
- Genus: Megachile
- Species: M. patellimana

Binomial name
- Megachile patellimana Spinola, 1838

Species of leafcutter bee (Megachile)

Megachile patellimana is a species of bee in the family Megachilidae. It was described by Spinola in 1838.
