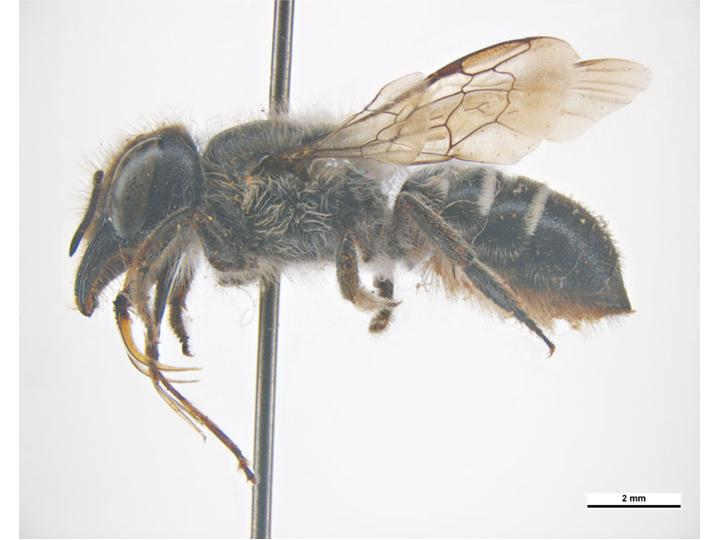
- Megachile remeata - Female

Scientific classification
- Kingdom: Animalia
- Phylum: Arthropoda
- Class: Insecta
- Order: Hymenoptera
- Family: Megachilidae
- Genus: Megachile
- Species: M. remeata

Binomial name
- Megachile remeata Cockerell, 1913

= Megachile remeata =

Species of leafcutter bee (Megachile)

Megachile remeata is a species of bee in the family Megachilidae. It was described by Theodore Dru Alison Cockerell in 1913.
