= Megachile manchuriana =

Scientific classification
- Domain: Eukaryota
- Kingdom: Animalia
- Phylum: Arthropoda
- Class: Insecta
- Order: Hymenoptera
- Family: Megachilidae
- Genus: Megachile
- Species: M. manchuriana

Binomial name
- Megachile manchuriana Yatsumatsu, 1939

Species of leafcutter bee (Megachile)

Megachile manchuriana is a species of bee in the family Megachilidae. It was described by Yatsumatsu in 1939.
