= Megachile xanthothrix =

Scientific classification
- Domain: Eukaryota
- Kingdom: Animalia
- Phylum: Arthropoda
- Class: Insecta
- Order: Hymenoptera
- Family: Megachilidae
- Genus: Megachile
- Species: M. xanthothrix

Binomial name
- Megachile xanthothrix Yasumatsu & Hirashima, 1964

Species of leafcutter bee (Megachile)

Megachile xanthothrix is a species of bee in the family Megachilidae. It was described by Yasumatsu & Hirashima in 1964.
