= Megachile strandi =

Scientific classification
- Domain: Eukaryota
- Kingdom: Animalia
- Phylum: Arthropoda
- Class: Insecta
- Order: Hymenoptera
- Family: Megachilidae
- Genus: Megachile
- Species: M. strandi

Binomial name
- Megachile strandi (Popov, 1936)

Species of leafcutter bee (Megachile)

Megachile strandi is a species of bee in the family Megachilidae. It was described by Popov in 1936.
