= Megachile hubeiensis =

Scientific classification
- Domain: Eukaryota
- Kingdom: Animalia
- Phylum: Arthropoda
- Class: Insecta
- Order: Hymenoptera
- Family: Megachilidae
- Genus: Megachile
- Species: M. hubeiensis

Binomial name
- Megachile hubeiensis Wu, 2005

Species of leafcutter bee (Megachile)

Megachile hubeiensis is a species of bee in the family Megachilidae, which was described by Yan-Ru Wu in 2005.
