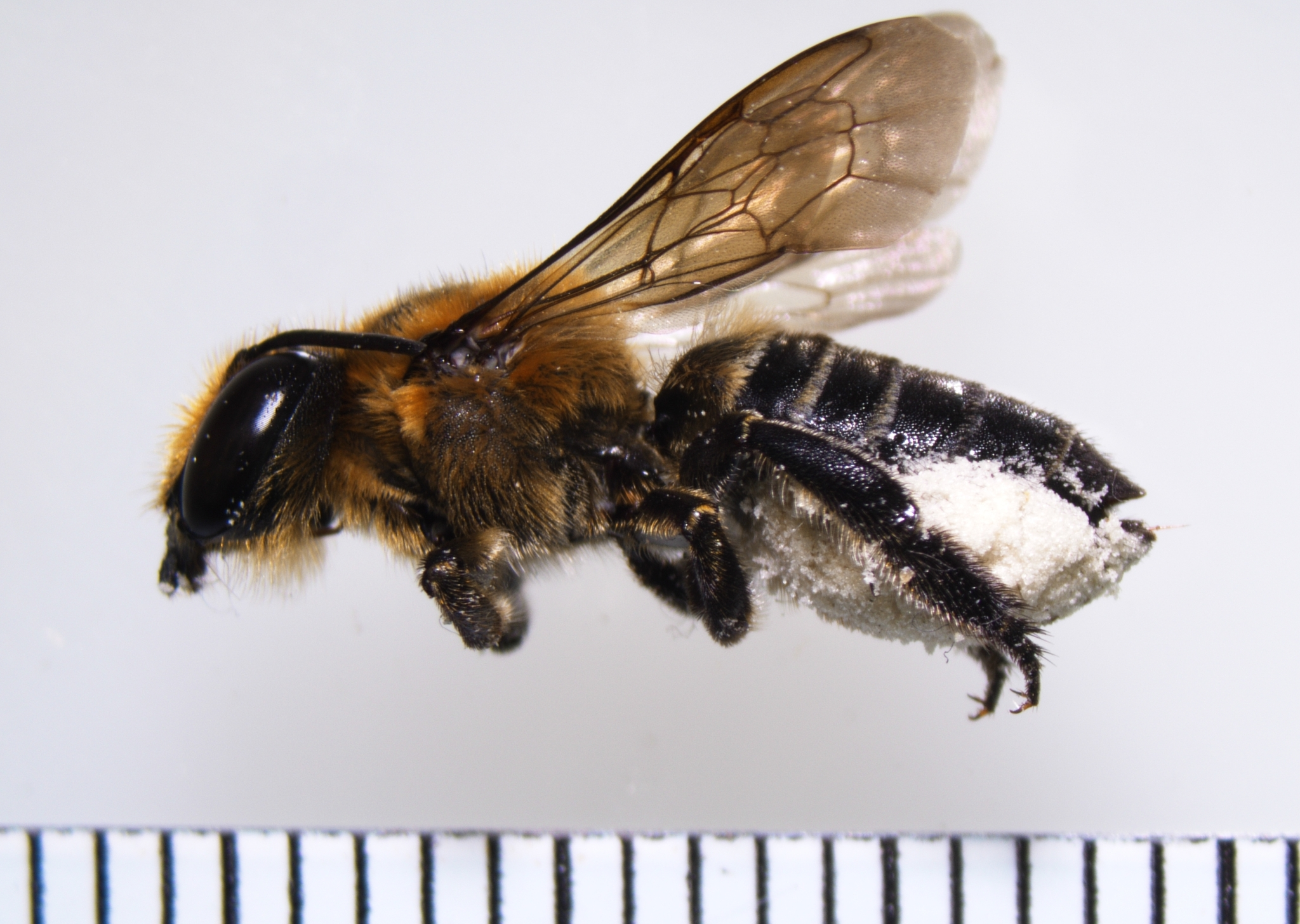
- Megachile palaonica observed in Rarotonga in 2024

Scientific classification
- Kingdom: Animalia
- Phylum: Arthropoda
- Class: Insecta
- Order: Hymenoptera
- Family: Megachilidae
- Genus: Megachile
- Species: M. palaonica

Binomial name
- Megachile palaonica Cockerell, 1939

= Megachile palaonica =

Species of leafcutter bee (Megachile)

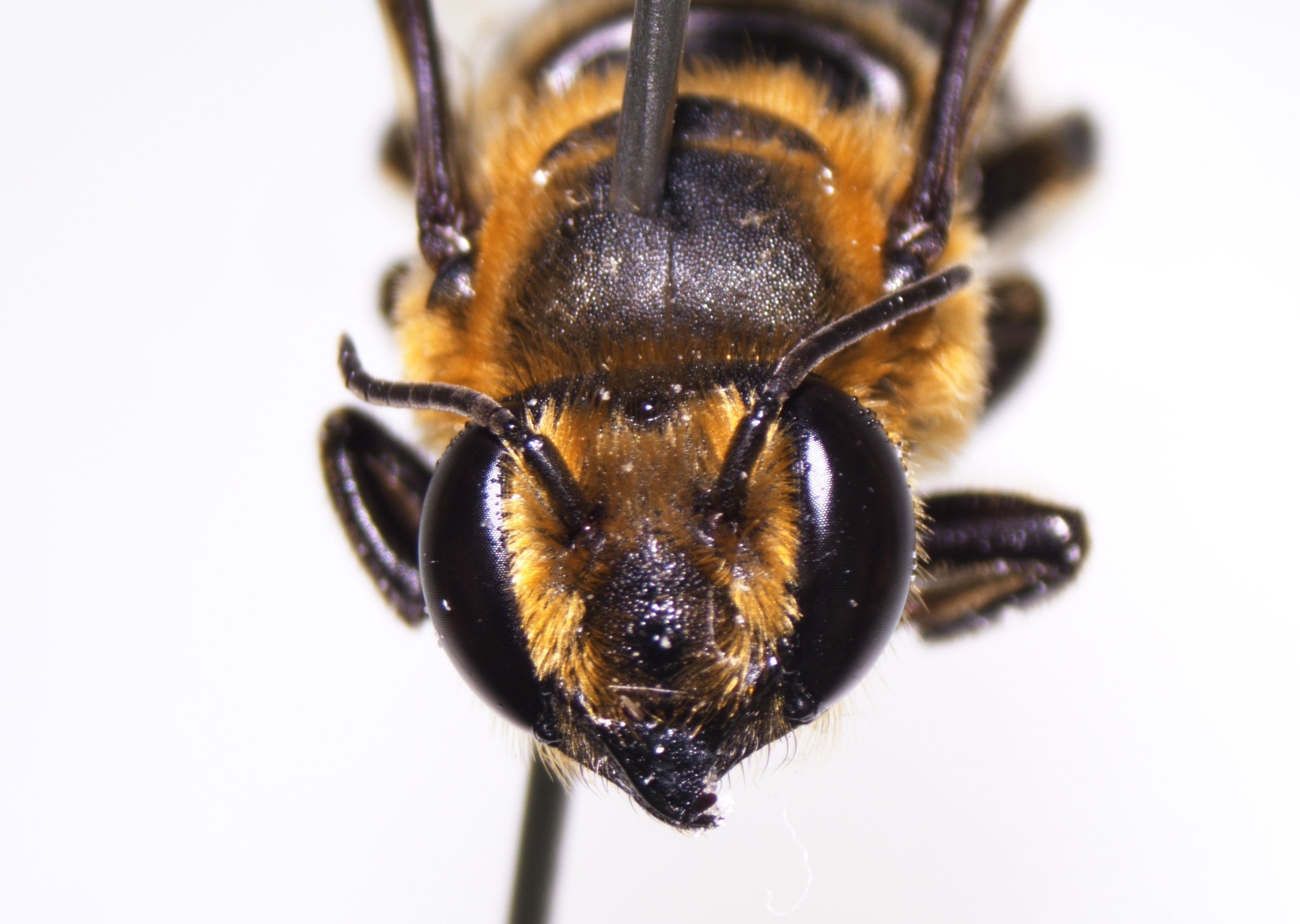
Close up of head

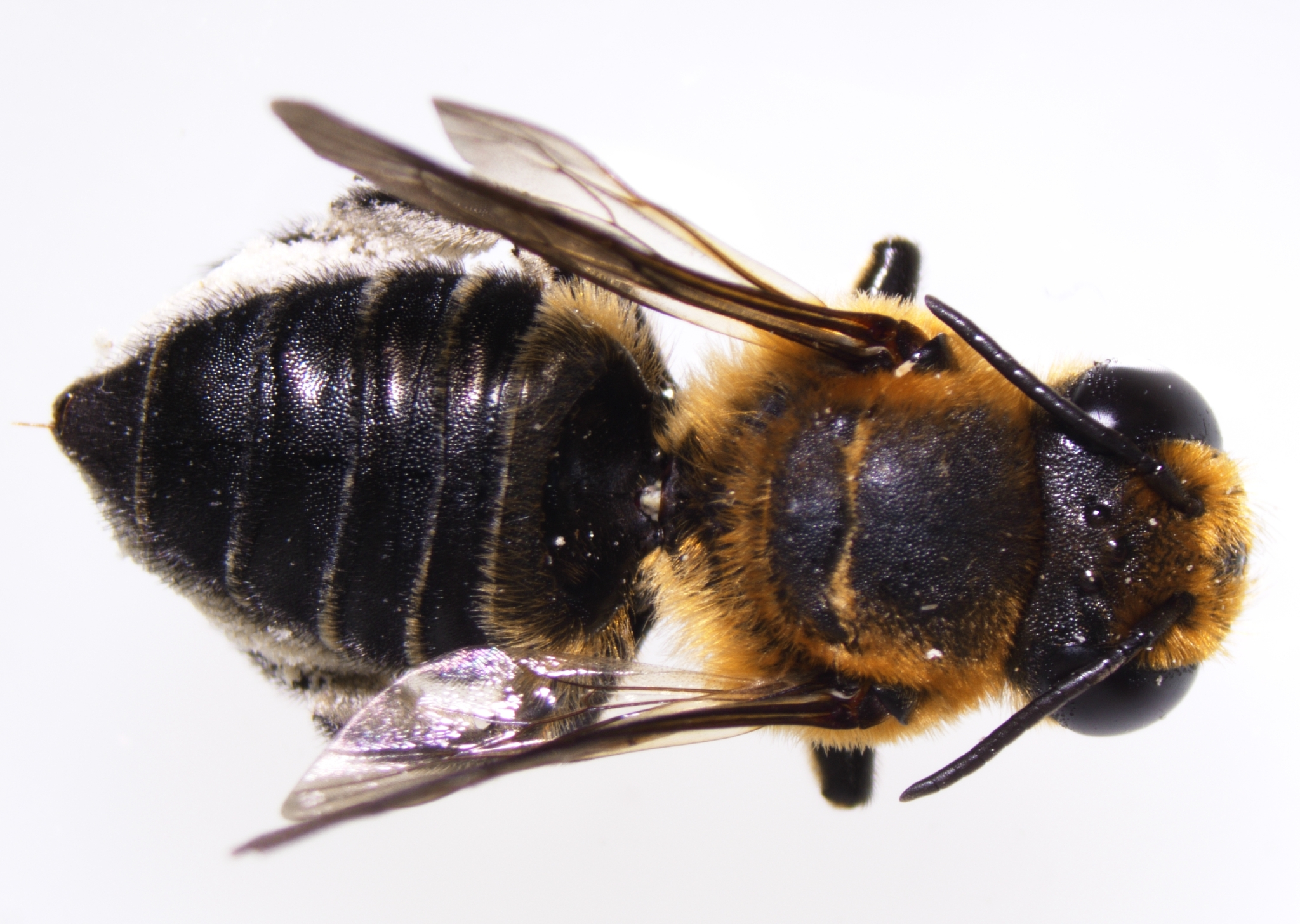
View from top of abdomen, thorax, wings and head.

Megachile palaonica is a species of bee in the family Megachilidae. It was described by Theodore Dru Alison Cockerell in 1939.
