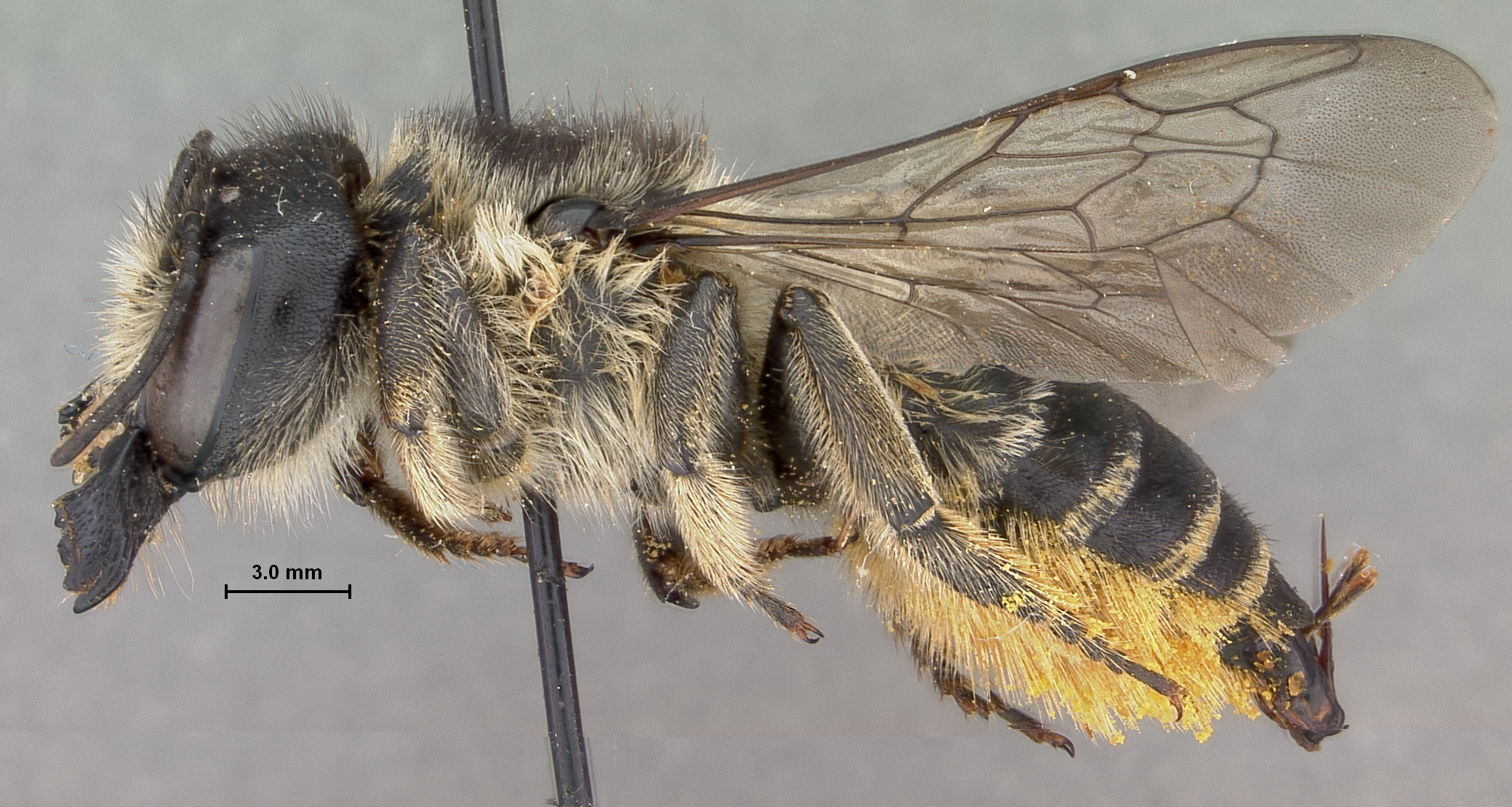

Scientific classification
- Domain: Eukaryota
- Kingdom: Animalia
- Phylum: Arthropoda
- Class: Insecta
- Order: Hymenoptera
- Family: Megachilidae
- Genus: Megachile
- Species: M. inermis

Binomial name
- Megachile inermis Provancher, 1888

= Megachile inermis =

Species of leafcutter bee (Megachile)

Megachile inermis is a species of bee in the family Megachilidae. It was described by Provancher in 1888.
