= Megachile alta =

Scientific classification
- Kingdom: Animalia
- Phylum: Arthropoda
- Class: Insecta
- Order: Hymenoptera
- Family: Megachilidae
- Genus: Megachile
- Species: M. alta

Binomial name
- Megachile alta Mitchell, 1930

Species of leafcutter bee (Megachile)

Megachile alta is a species of bee in the family Megachilidae. It was described by Mitchell in 1930, and has been found in both Costa Rica and Brazil.
