= Megachile leucopyga =

Scientific classification
- Kingdom: Animalia
- Phylum: Arthropoda
- Class: Insecta
- Order: Hymenoptera
- Family: Megachilidae
- Genus: Megachile
- Species: M. leucopyga

Binomial name
- Megachile leucopyga Smith, 1853

Species of leafcutter bee (Megachile)

Megachile leucopyga is a species of bee in the family Megachilidae. It was described by Smith in 1853.

It has been collected in the Australian states of New South Wales and Tasmania
