= Megachile affinis =

Scientific classification
- Domain: Eukaryota
- Kingdom: Animalia
- Phylum: Arthropoda
- Class: Insecta
- Order: Hymenoptera
- Family: Megachilidae
- Genus: Megachile
- Species: M. affinis

Binomial name
- Megachile affinis Brullé, 1832

Species of leafcutter bee (Megachile)

Megachile affinis is a species of bee in the family Megachilidae. It was described by Brullé in 1832.
