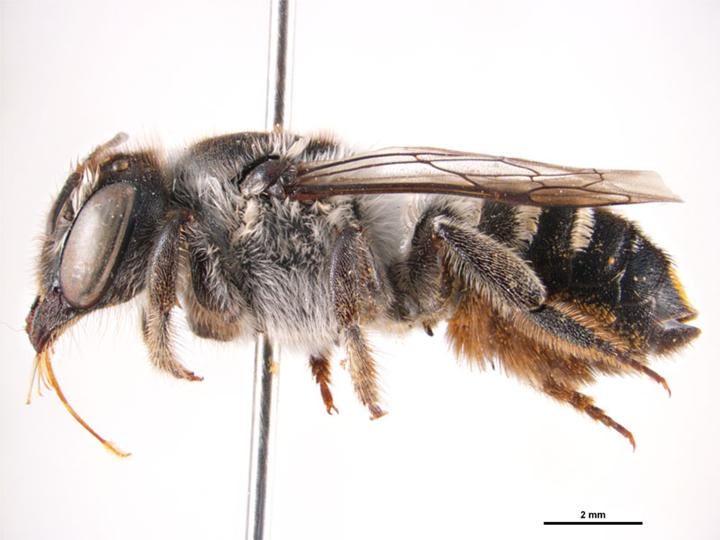
- Megachile resinifera

Scientific classification
- Kingdom: Animalia
- Phylum: Arthropoda
- Class: Insecta
- Order: Hymenoptera
- Family: Megachilidae
- Genus: Megachile
- Species: M. resinifera

Binomial name
- Megachile resinifera Meade-Waldo, 1915

= Megachile resinifera =

Species of leafcutter bee (Megachile)

Megachile resinifera is a species of bee in the family Megachilidae. It was described by Meade-Waldo in 1915.
