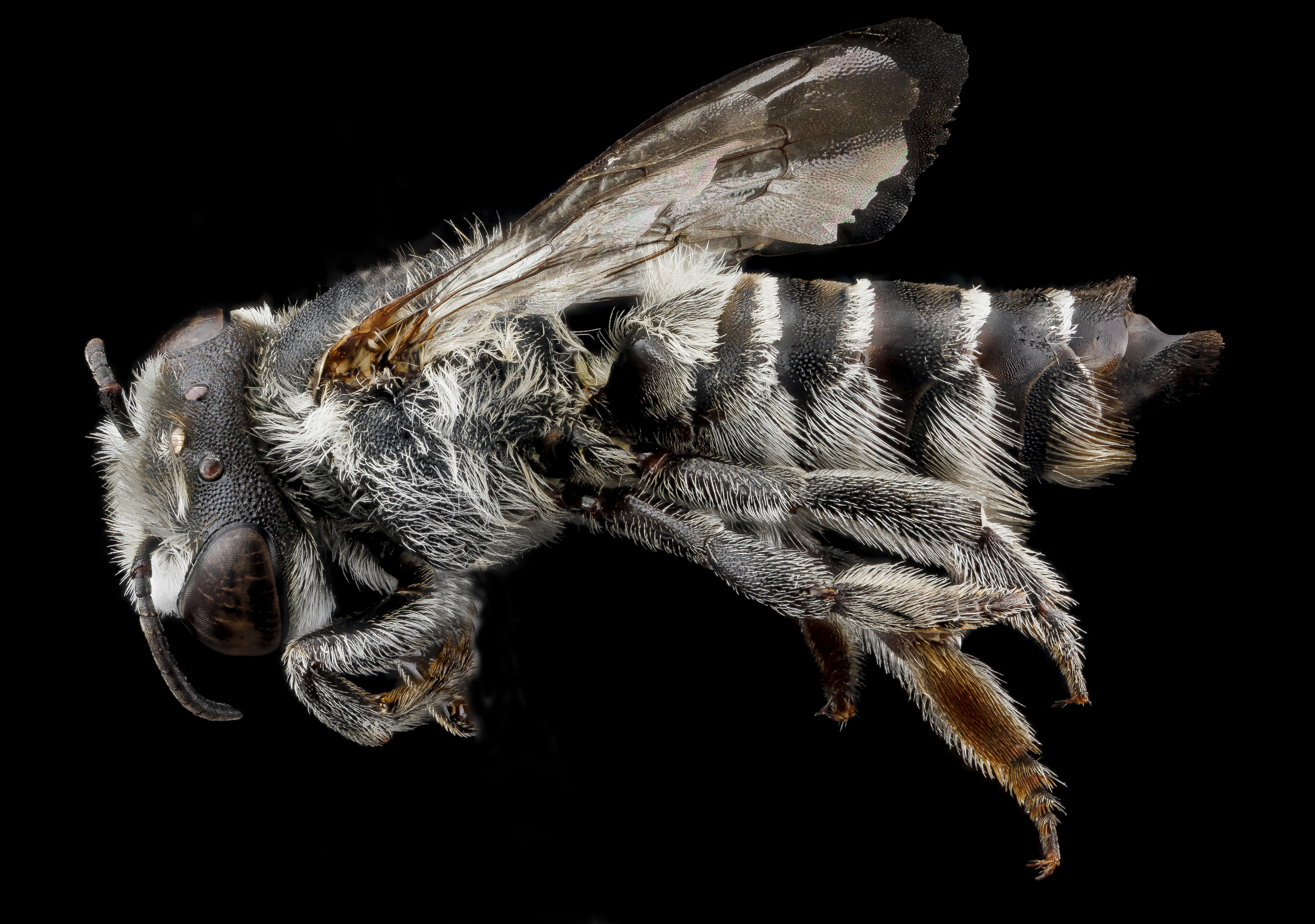

Scientific classification
- Kingdom: Animalia
- Phylum: Arthropoda
- Class: Insecta
- Order: Hymenoptera
- Family: Megachilidae
- Genus: Megachile
- Species: M. venusta

Binomial name
- Megachile venusta Smith, 1853

Synonyms
- Megachile gratiosa Gerstäcker, 1857; Megachile modesta Smith, 1879 (Homonym); Megachile modestissima Dalla Torre, 1896; Megachile ancillula Vachal, 1903; Megachile strictipalmis Vachal, 1903; Megachile marusa Cameron, 1905; Megachile robertiana Cameron, 1905; Megachile sarna Cameron, 1905; Megachile venustella Cockerell, 1917; Megachile umbiloensis Cockerell, 1920; Megachile semivenusta Cockerell, 1930 (Nomen nudum); Megachile semivenusta Cockerell, 1931; Megachile tenuinervis Cockerell, 1931; Megachile venusta malelana Cockerell, 1935; Megachile acallognatha Cockerell, 1937; Megachile megaspilura Cockerell, 1937; Megachile oculifera Cockerell, 1937; Megachile uvirensis Cockerell, 1937

= Megachile venusta =

Species of leafcutter bee (Megachile)

Megachile venusta is a species of bee in the family Megachilidae. It was described by Smith in 1853.
