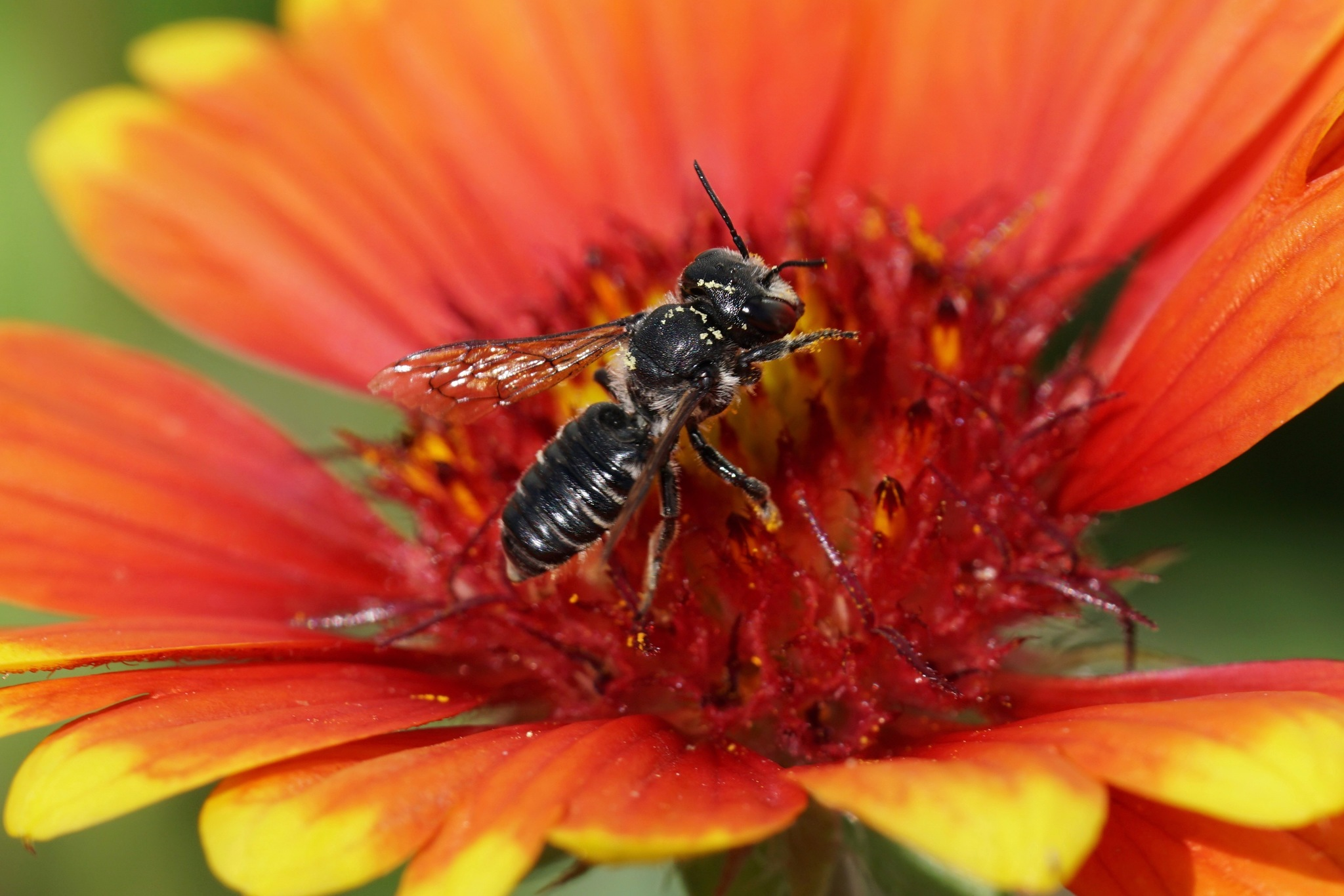

Scientific classification
- Domain: Eukaryota
- Kingdom: Animalia
- Phylum: Arthropoda
- Class: Insecta
- Order: Hymenoptera
- Family: Megachilidae
- Genus: Megachile
- Species: M. montivaga

Binomial name
- Megachile montivaga Cresson, 1878

Synonyms
- Megachile helianthi Cockerell, 1908

= Megachile montivaga =

Species of leafcutter bee (Megachile)

Megachile montivaga is a species of bee in the family Megachilidae. It was described by Cresson in 1878. In English, the species is called the silver-tailed petal-cutter bee while in French its common name is Mégachile des collines.
