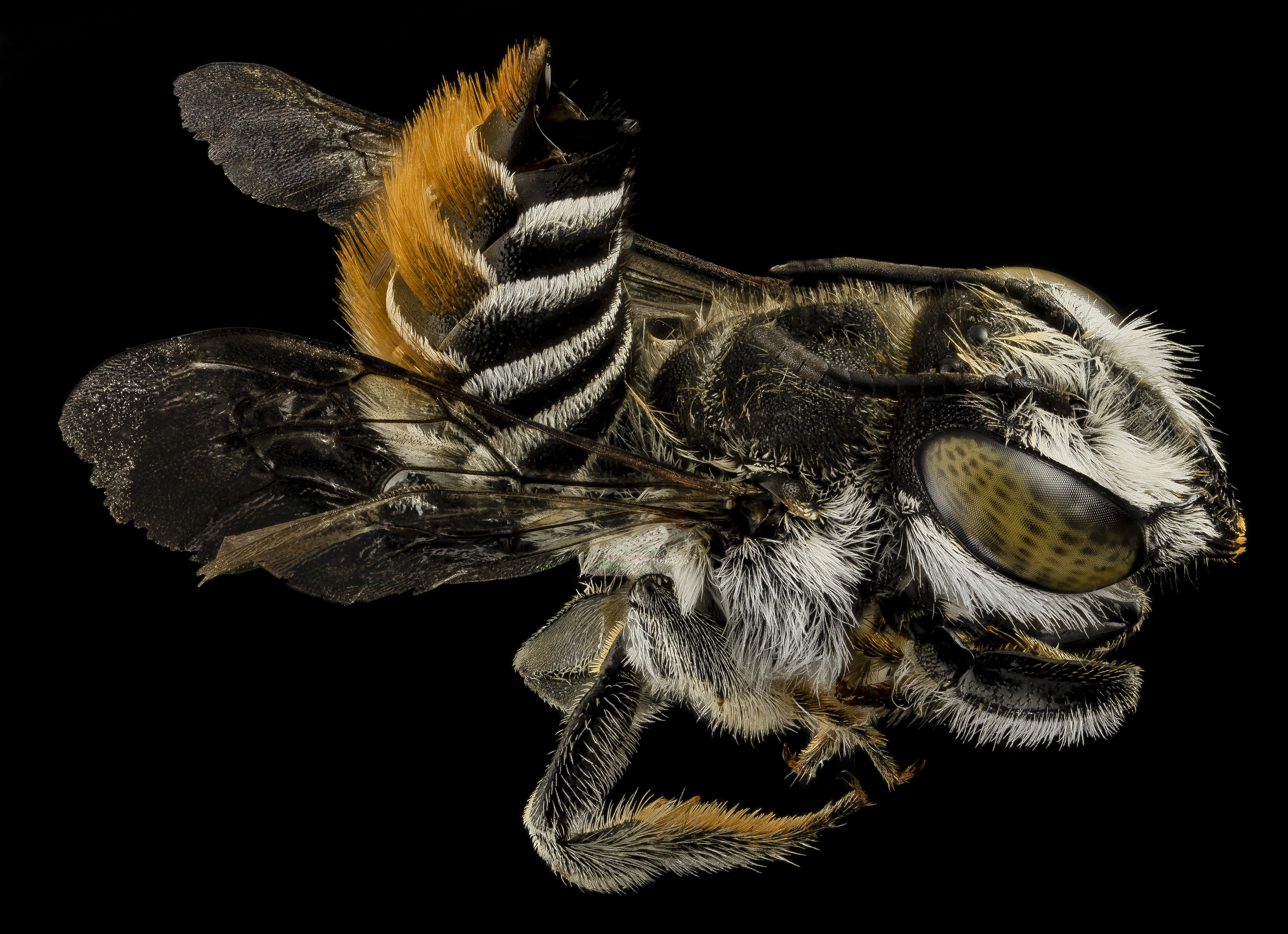

Scientific classification
- Kingdom: Animalia
- Phylum: Arthropoda
- Class: Insecta
- Order: Hymenoptera
- Family: Megachilidae
- Genus: Megachile
- Species: M. fullawayi

Binomial name
- Megachile fullawayi Cockerell, 1914

= Megachile fullawayi =

Species of leafcutter bee (Megachile)

Megachile fullawayi is a species of bee in the family Megachilidae. It is present in Hawaii, the Northern Mariana Islands, and Guam. It was described by Theodore Dru Alison Cockerell in 1914.
