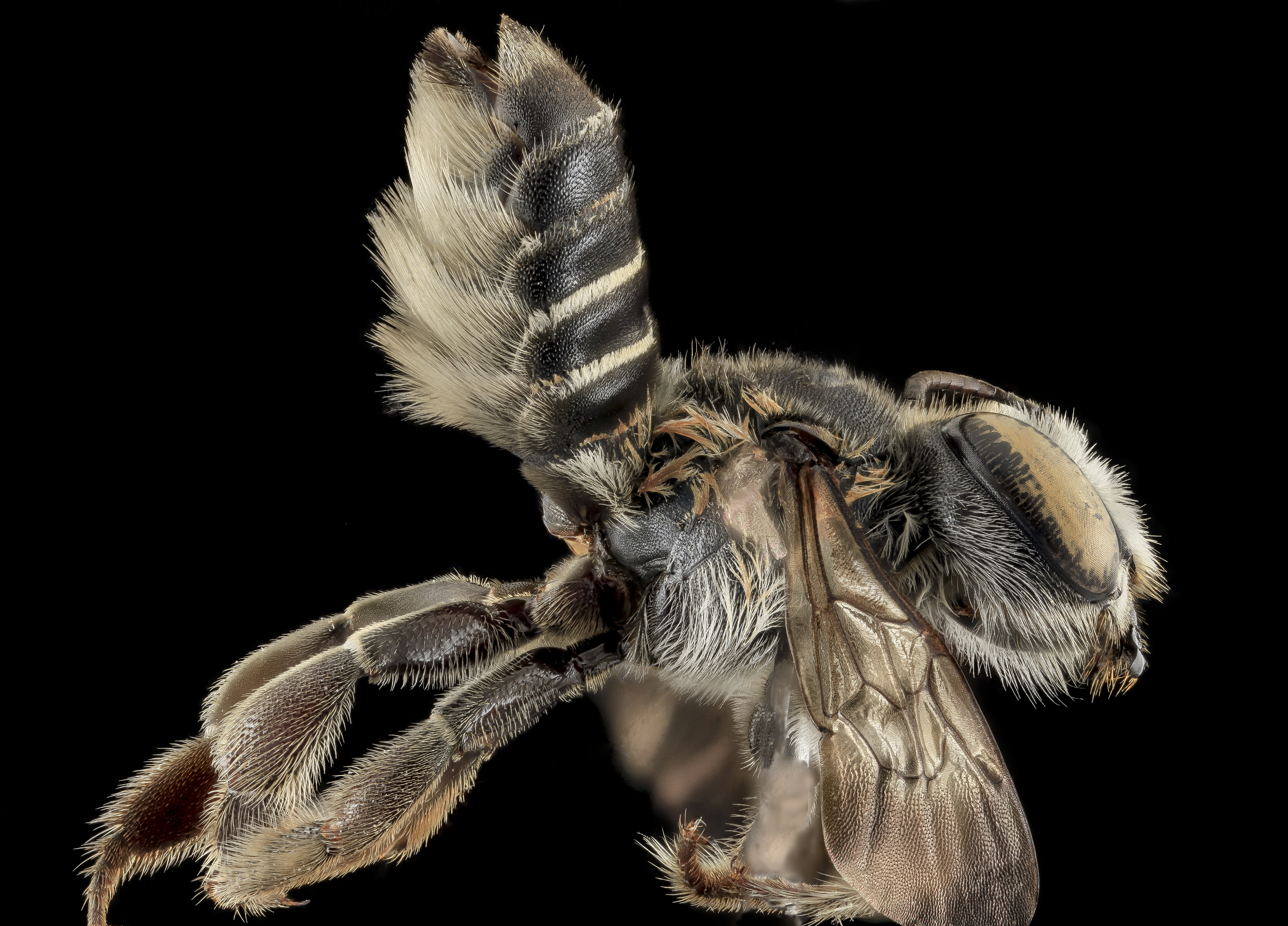

Conservation status
- Critically Imperiled (NatureServe)

Scientific classification
- Domain: Eukaryota
- Kingdom: Animalia
- Phylum: Arthropoda
- Class: Insecta
- Order: Hymenoptera
- Family: Megachilidae
- Genus: Megachile
- Species: M. integrella

Binomial name
- Megachile integrella Mitchell, 1926

= Megachile integrella =

Species of leafcutter bee (Megachile)

Megachile integrella is a species of bee in the family Megachilidae. It was described by Mitchell in 1926.
