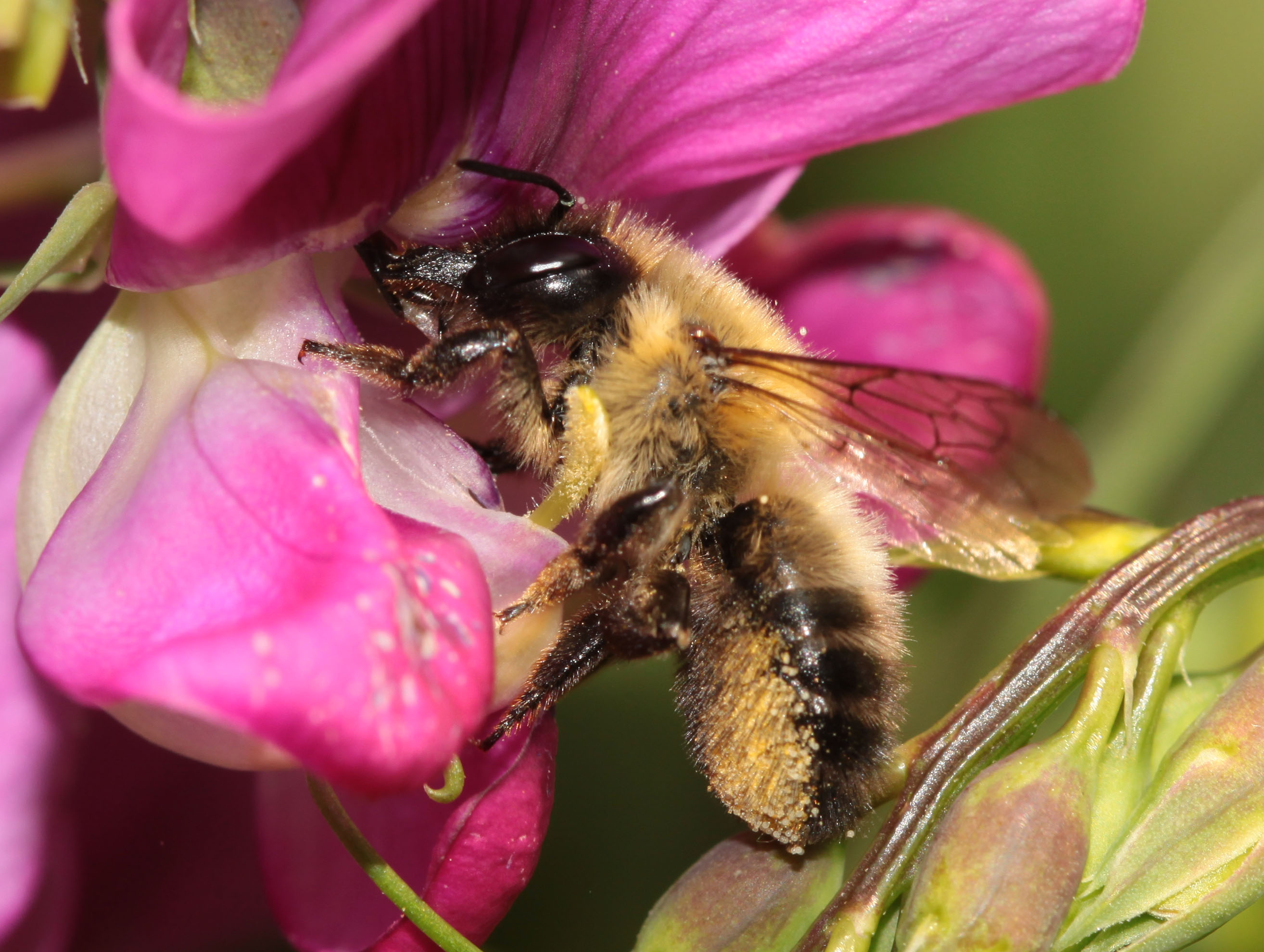

Scientific classification
- Domain: Eukaryota
- Kingdom: Animalia
- Phylum: Arthropoda
- Class: Insecta
- Order: Hymenoptera
- Family: Megachilidae
- Genus: Megachile
- Species: M. nigriventris

Binomial name
- Megachile nigriventris Schenck, 1870

= Megachile nigriventris =

Species of leafcutter bee (Megachile)

Megachile nigriventris is a species of bee in the family Megachilidae. It was described by Schenck in 1870.
