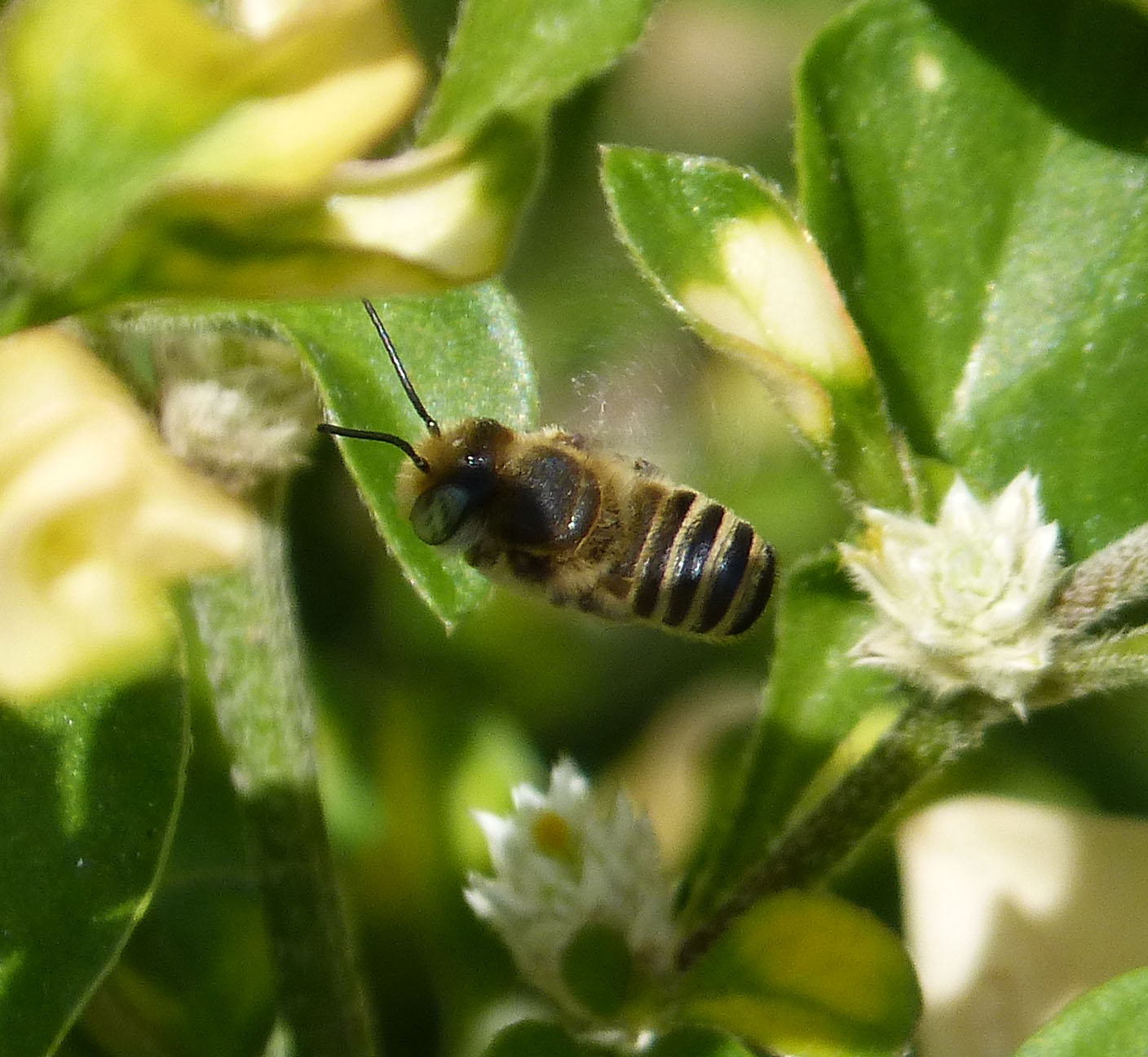

Scientific classification
- Domain: Eukaryota
- Kingdom: Animalia
- Phylum: Arthropoda
- Class: Insecta
- Order: Hymenoptera
- Family: Megachilidae
- Genus: Megachile
- Species: M. singularis

Binomial name
- Megachile singularis Cresson, 1865

= Megachile singularis =

Species of leafcutter bee (Megachile)

Megachile singularis is a species of bee in the family Megachilidae. It was described by Cresson in 1865.
