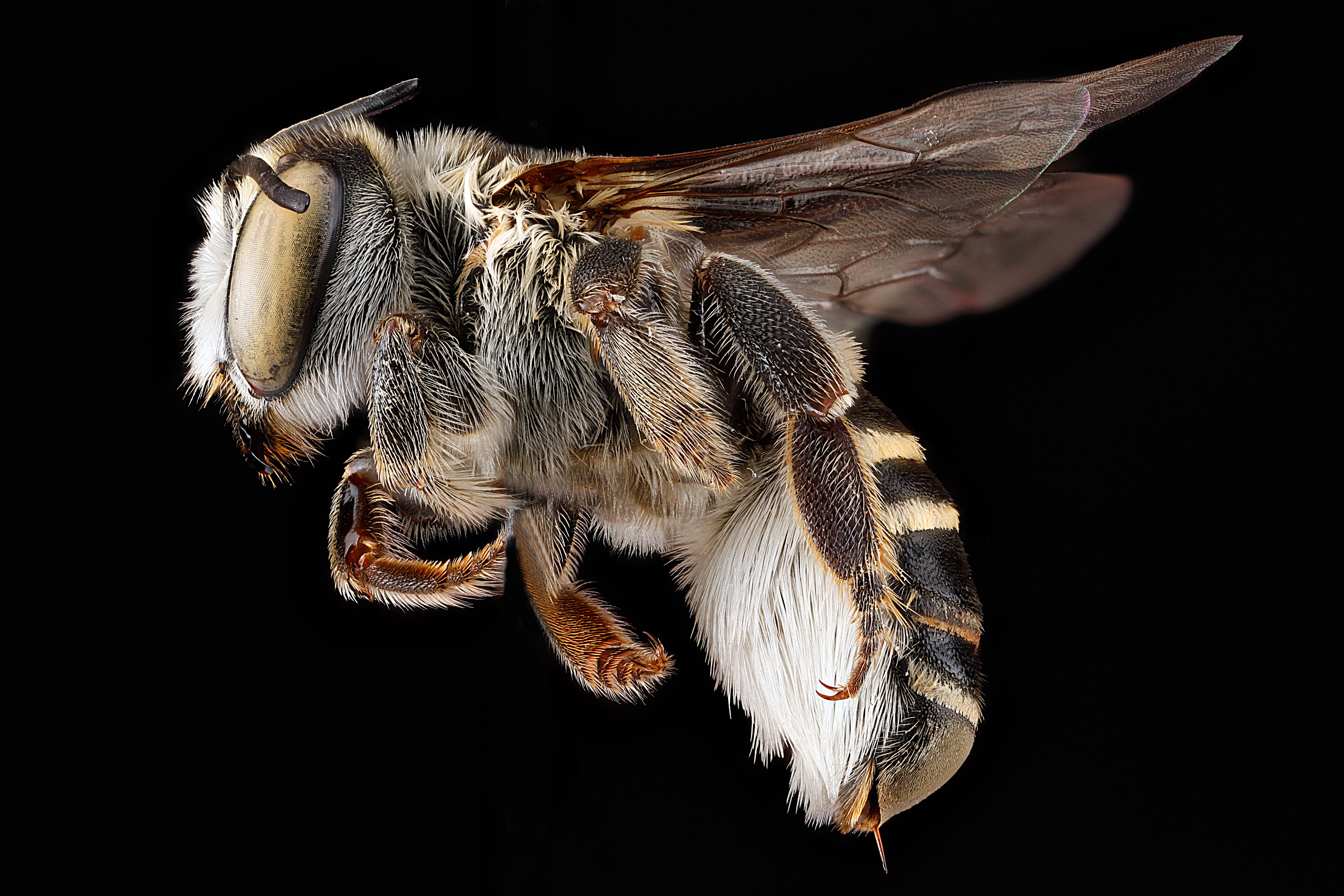
- Megachile townsendiana, female

Scientific classification
- Kingdom: Animalia
- Phylum: Arthropoda
- Class: Insecta
- Order: Hymenoptera
- Family: Megachilidae
- Genus: Megachile
- Species: M. townsendiana

Binomial name
- Megachile townsendiana Cockerell, 1898

= Megachile townsendiana =

Species of leafcutter bee (Megachile)

Megachile townsendiana is a species of bee in the family Megachilidae. It was described by Theodore Dru Alison Cockerell in 1898.
