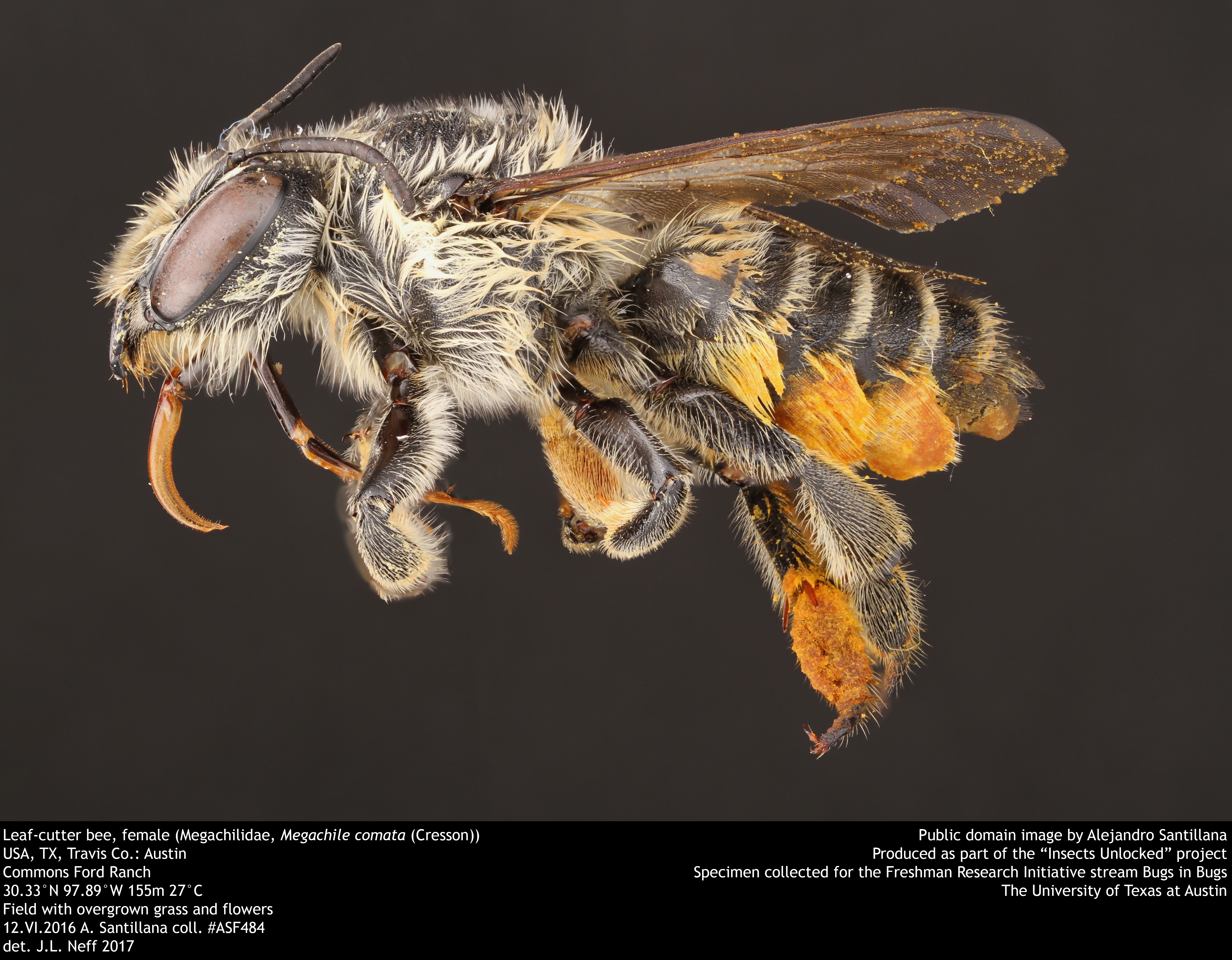

Scientific classification
- Domain: Eukaryota
- Kingdom: Animalia
- Phylum: Arthropoda
- Class: Insecta
- Order: Hymenoptera
- Family: Megachilidae
- Genus: Megachile
- Species: M. comata

Binomial name
- Megachile comata Cresson, 1872

= Megachile comata =

Species of leafcutter bee (Megachile)

Megachile comata is a species of bee in the family of Megachilidae. It was described by Cresson in 1872.
