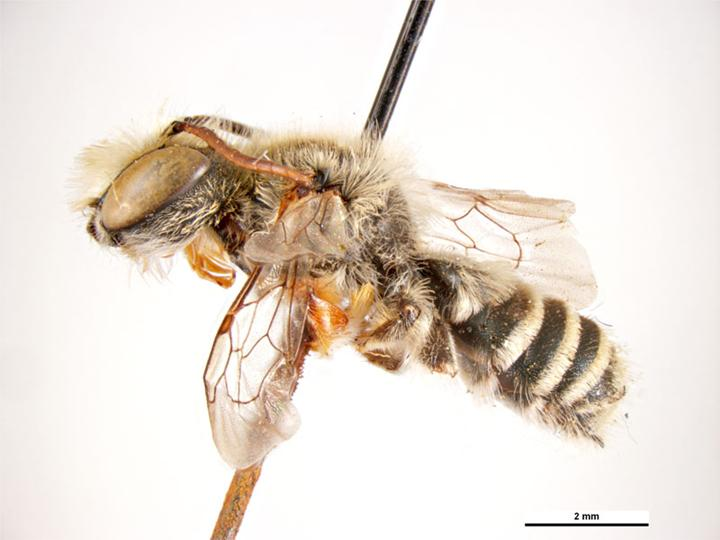

Scientific classification
- Kingdom: Animalia
- Phylum: Arthropoda
- Class: Insecta
- Order: Hymenoptera
- Family: Megachilidae
- Genus: Megachile
- Species: M. cygnorum

Binomial name
- Megachile cygnorum Cockerell, 1906

= Megachile cygnorum =

Species of leafcutter bee (Megachile)

Megachile cygnorum is a species of bee in the family Megachilidae. It was described by Theodore Dru Alison Cockerell in 1906.
