= Megachile pictiventris =

Scientific classification
- Kingdom: Animalia
- Phylum: Arthropoda
- Class: Insecta
- Order: Hymenoptera
- Family: Megachilidae
- Genus: Megachile
- Species: M. pictiventris

Binomial name
- Megachile pictiventris Smith, 1879

Species of leafcutter bee (Megachile)

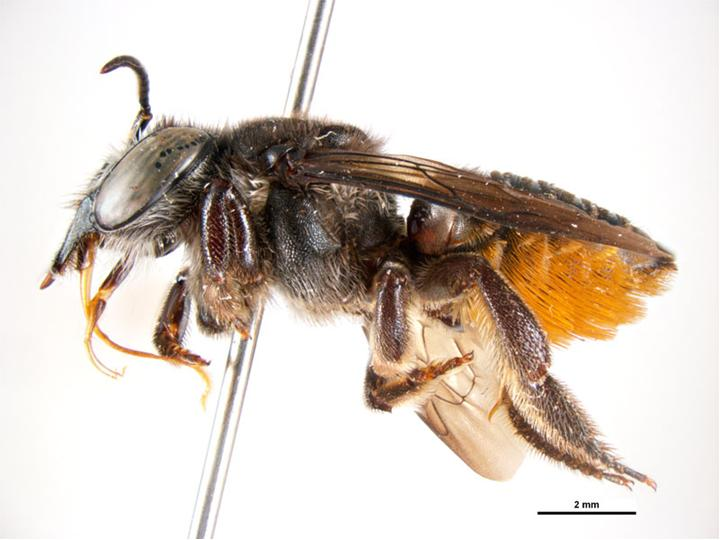

Megachile pictiventris is a species of bee in the family Megachilidae. It was described by Smith in 1879. It resides along the coast of Australia.
