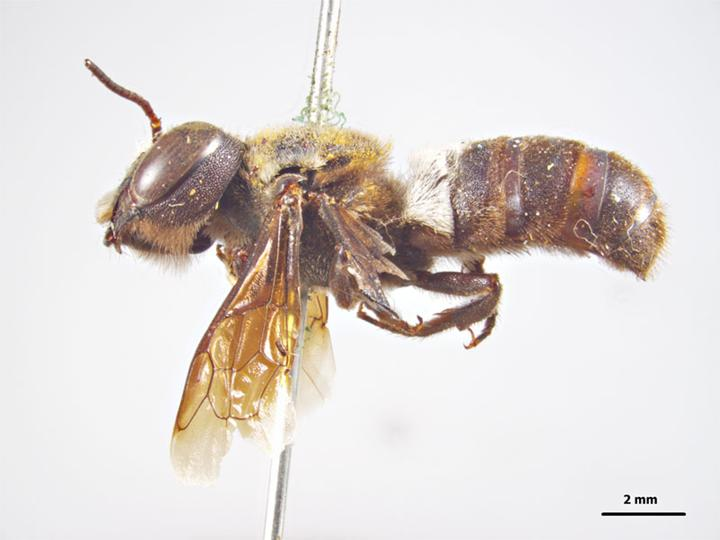

Scientific classification
- Kingdom: Animalia
- Phylum: Arthropoda
- Class: Insecta
- Order: Hymenoptera
- Family: Megachilidae
- Genus: Megachile
- Species: M. doddiana

Binomial name
- Megachile doddiana Cockerell, 1906

= Megachile doddiana =

Species of leafcutter bee (Megachile)

Megachile doddiana is a species of bee in the family Megachilidae. It was described by Theodore Dru Alison Cockerell in 1906.
