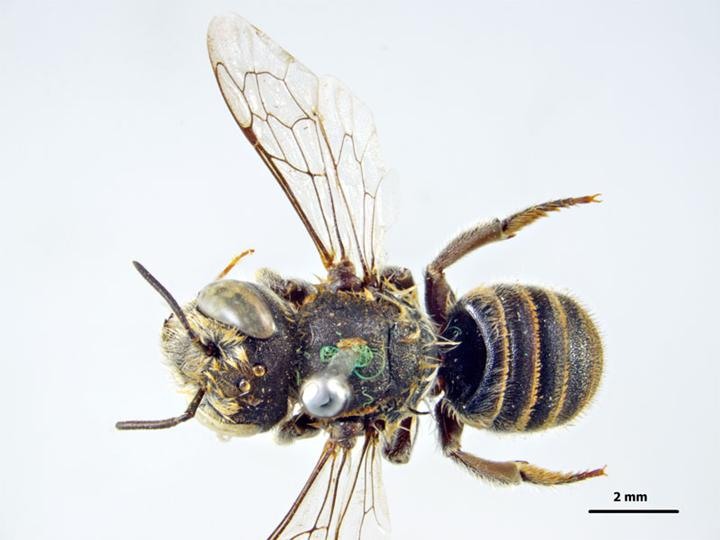

Scientific classification
- Kingdom: Animalia
- Phylum: Arthropoda
- Class: Insecta
- Order: Hymenoptera
- Family: Megachilidae
- Genus: Megachile
- Species: M. mundifica

Binomial name
- Megachile mundifica Cockerell, 1921

= Megachile mundifica =

Species of leafcutter bee (Megachile)

Megachile mundifica is a species of bee in the family Megachilidae described by Theodore Dru Alison Cockerell in 1921.
