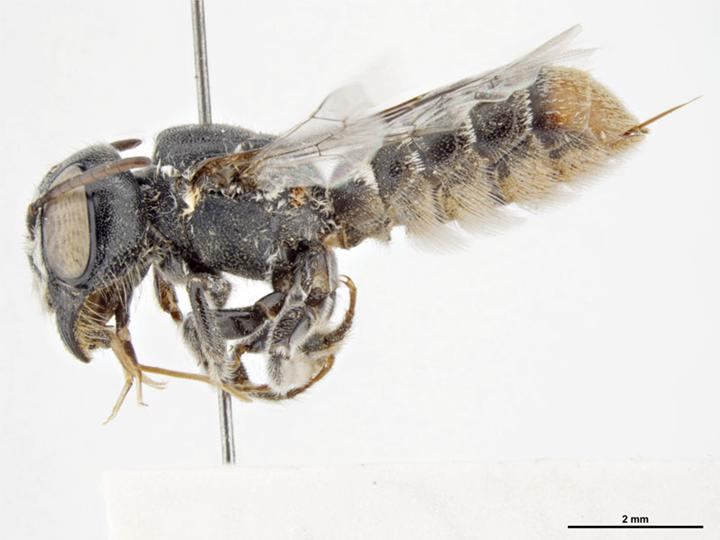
- Female

Scientific classification
- Kingdom: Animalia
- Phylum: Arthropoda
- Clade: Pancrustacea
- Class: Insecta
- Order: Hymenoptera
- Family: Megachilidae
- Genus: Megachile
- Species: M. variabilis

Binomial name
- Megachile variabilis (King, 1994)

= Megachile variabilis =

Species of leafcutter bee

Megachile variabilis is a species of bee in the family Megachilidae. It was described by King in 1994.
