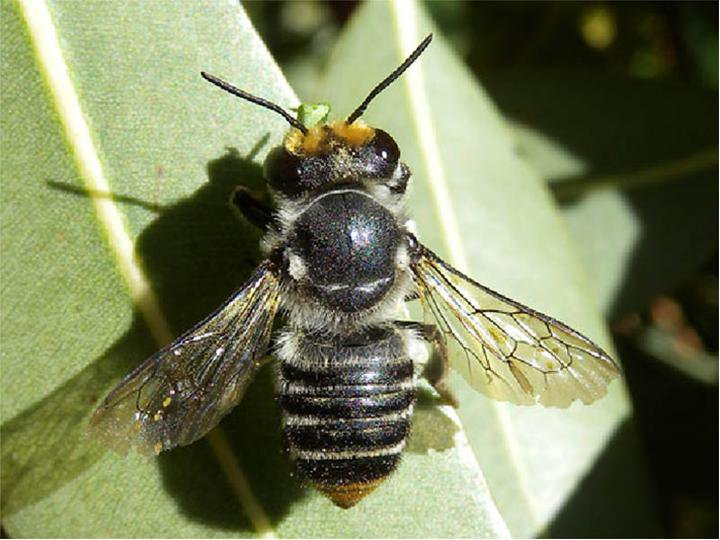

Scientific classification
- Kingdom: Animalia
- Phylum: Arthropoda
- Class: Insecta
- Order: Hymenoptera
- Family: Megachilidae
- Genus: Megachile
- Species: M. ferox

Binomial name
- Megachile ferox Smith, 1879

= Megachile ferox =

Species of leafcutter bee (Megachile)

Megachile ferox is a species of bee in the family Megachilidae. It was described by Smith in 1879.
