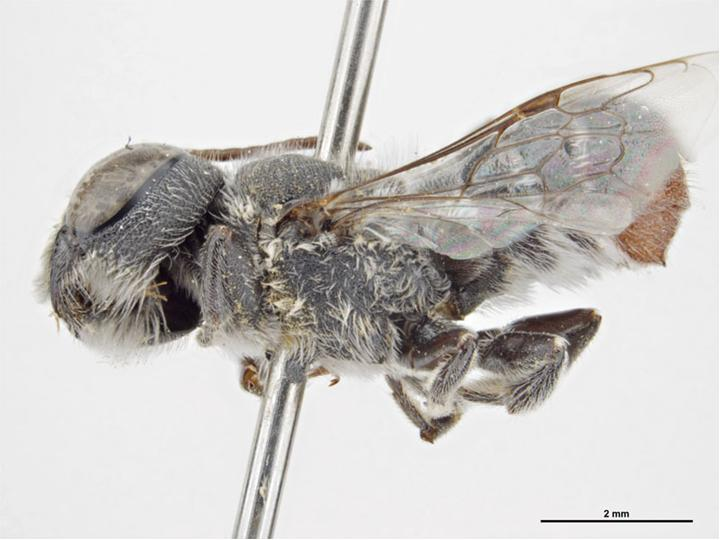

Scientific classification
- Kingdom: Animalia
- Phylum: Arthropoda
- Class: Insecta
- Order: Hymenoptera
- Family: Megachilidae
- Genus: Megachile
- Species: M. emexae

Binomial name
- Megachile emexae (King, 1994)

= Megachile emexae =

Species of leafcutter bee (Megachile)

Megachile emexae is a species of bee in the family Megachilidae. It was described by King in 1994.
