= Megachile cordata =

Scientific classification
- Domain: Eukaryota
- Kingdom: Animalia
- Phylum: Arthropoda
- Class: Insecta
- Order: Hymenoptera
- Family: Megachilidae
- Genus: Megachile
- Species: M. cordata

Binomial name
- Megachile cordata Smith, 1879

Synonyms
- Megachile frontalis Smith, 1853 (Homonym); Megachile tardula Cameron, 1905; Megachile ekuivella Cockerell, 1909; Megachile krebsiana Strand, 1911; Megachile natalica Cockerell, 1920; Megachile rhodesica Cockerell, 1920; Megachile masaiella Cockerell, 1930; Megachile callognatha Cockerell, 1932; Megachile chromatica Cockerell, 1932; Megachile gratiosella Cockerell, 1935; Megachile harthulura Cockerell, 1937; Megachile rhodesica haematognatha Cockerell, 1937; Megachile ekuivensis Cockerell, 1937 (Misspelling); Megachile mackieae Cockerell, 1937; Megachile flammicauda Cockerell, 1937; Megachile venusta var. semiflava Cockerell, 1937; Megachile rufulina Cockerell, 1937; Megachile rufosuffusa Cockerell, 1937; Megachile melanura Cockerell, 1937; Megachile asarna Cockerell, 1937; Megachile heteroscopa Cockerell, 1937; Megachile capiticola Cockerell, 1938; Megachile subcordata Cockerell, 1938

Species of leafcutter bee (Megachile)

Megachile cordata is a species of bee in the family Megachilidae. It was described by Smith in 1853, and renamed in 1879.
