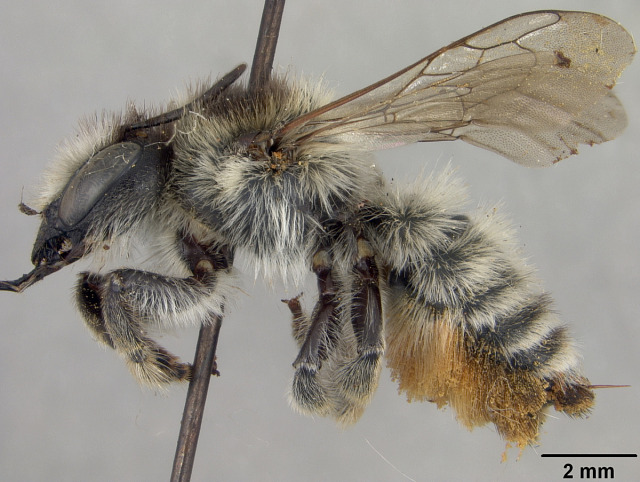

Scientific classification
- Domain: Eukaryota
- Kingdom: Animalia
- Phylum: Arthropoda
- Class: Insecta
- Order: Hymenoptera
- Family: Megachilidae
- Genus: Megachile
- Species: M. analis

Binomial name
- Megachile analis Nylander, 1852

= Megachile analis =

Species of leafcutter bee (Megachile)

Megachile analis is a species of bee in the family Megachilidae. It was described by William Nylander in 1852. It occurs in Europe.
