= Megachile bituberculata =

Scientific classification
- Domain: Eukaryota
- Kingdom: Animalia
- Phylum: Arthropoda
- Class: Insecta
- Order: Hymenoptera
- Family: Megachilidae
- Genus: Megachile
- Species: M. bituberculata

Binomial name
- Megachile bituberculata Ritsema, 1880

Synonyms
- Megachile tuberculata Smith, 1879 (Homonym); Megachile sjoestedti Friese, 1901; Megachile sjoestedti var. emarginata Friese, 1902; Megachile schaeferana Strand, 1911; Megachile emarginata var. lua Strand, 1912; Megachile sjoestedti var. rubripedana Strand, 1914; Megachile mediocana Cockerell, 1916

Species of leafcutter bee (Megachile)

Megachile bituberculata is a species of bee in the family Megachilidae. It was described by Smith in 1879, and renamed by Ritsema in 1880; it occurs in Sub-Saharan Africa.
