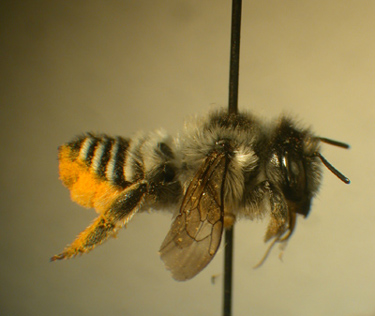

Scientific classification
- Domain: Eukaryota
- Kingdom: Animalia
- Phylum: Arthropoda
- Class: Insecta
- Order: Hymenoptera
- Family: Megachilidae
- Genus: Megachile
- Species: M. wheeleri

Binomial name
- Megachile wheeleri Mitchell, 1927

= Megachile wheeleri =

Species of leafcutter bee (Megachile)

Megachile wheeleri is a species of bee in the family Megachilidae. It was described by Mitchell in 1927.
