= Megachile malangensis =

Scientific classification
- Domain: Eukaryota
- Kingdom: Animalia
- Phylum: Arthropoda
- Class: Insecta
- Order: Hymenoptera
- Family: Megachilidae
- Genus: Megachile
- Species: M. malangensis

Binomial name
- Megachile malangensis Friese, 1904

Synonyms
- Megachile stellarum Cockerell, 1920; Megachile laticeps Friese, 1925 (Homonym); Megachile rudihirta Cockerell, 1931; Megachile thomasseti Cockerell, 1931; Megachile thomasseti clarescens Cockerell, 1932; Megachile obesa Pasteels, 1965; Megachile ovatomaculata Pasteels, 1965; Megachile malangensis mamalapia Pasteels, 1965

Species of leafcutter bee (Megachile)

Megachile malangensis is a species of bee in the family Megachilidae. It was described by Friese in 1904.
