= Megachile wahlbergi =

Scientific classification
- Domain: Eukaryota
- Kingdom: Animalia
- Phylum: Arthropoda
- Class: Insecta
- Order: Hymenoptera
- Family: Megachilidae
- Genus: Megachile
- Species: M. wahlbergi

Binomial name
- Megachile wahlbergi Friese, 1901

Synonyms
- Megachile venustoides Strand 1911; Megachile opacula Cockerell 1920; Megachile carpenteri Cockerell 1931; Megachile caricina carpenteri Cockerell 1931; Megachile katangana Cockerell 1937; Megachile scotti Cockerell 1937; Megachile venustella zambesica Cockerell 1937; Megachile pondonis Cockerell 1944

Species of leafcutter bee (Megachile)

Megachile wahlbergi is a species of bee in the family Megachilidae. It was described by Friese in 1901.
