= Megachile grisea =

Scientific classification
- Kingdom: Animalia
- Phylum: Arthropoda
- Class: Insecta
- Order: Hymenoptera
- Family: Megachilidae
- Genus: Megachile
- Species: M. grisea

Binomial name
- Megachile grisea (Fabricius, 1794)

Species of leafcutter bee (Megachile)

Megachile grisea is a species of bee in the family Megachilidae. It was described by Johan Christian Fabricius in 1794.

Megachile grisea, like other leafcutter bees in its genus, is a solitary bee that nests in narrow cavities and constructs brood cells using pieces of leaves and petals. Female Megachile bees carry pollen on specialized hairs (scopa) on the underside of their abdomen, which makes them effective pollinators of wildflowers and crops.

Members of the genus Megachile are found worldwide and contribute to the pollination of diverse plant species.
