= Megachile eurimera =

Scientific classification
- Domain: Eukaryota
- Kingdom: Animalia
- Phylum: Arthropoda
- Class: Insecta
- Order: Hymenoptera
- Family: Megachilidae
- Genus: Megachile
- Species: M. eurimera

Binomial name
- Megachile eurimera Smith, 1854

Synonyms
- Megachile eurymera Smith, 1854 Emend. Megachile flavida Friese, 1903; Megachile flava Friese, 1903; Megachile loosi Vachal, 1903; Megachile garua Strand, 1911; Megachile tarsisignata Cockerell, 1920; Megachile rhodoleucura Cockerell, 1937

Species of leafcutter bee (Megachile)

Megachile eurimera is a species of bee in the family Megachilidae. It was described by Smith in 1854.
