= Megachile mlunguziensis =

Scientific classification
- Kingdom: Animalia
- Phylum: Arthropoda
- Class: Insecta
- Order: Hymenoptera
- Family: Megachilidae
- Genus: Megachile
- Species: M. mlunguziensis

Binomial name
- Megachile mlunguziensis Schulten, 1977

Species of leafcutter bee (Megachile)

Megachile mlunguziensis is a species of bee in the family Megachilidae. It was described by Schulten in 1977.

== Origin ==
It was described in 1977 by G. G. M. Schulten in a taxonomic work that reviewed Megachilidae from Malawi (Central Africa).

The 1977 work by Schulten described M. mlunguziensis among several other new species from Malawi; reflecting that the genus Megachile has rich species diversity in that region.
