= Megachile ingenua =

Conservation status
- Imperiled (NatureServe)

Scientific classification
- Domain: Eukaryota
- Kingdom: Animalia
- Phylum: Arthropoda
- Class: Insecta
- Order: Hymenoptera
- Family: Megachilidae
- Genus: Megachile
- Species: M. ingenua

Binomial name
- Megachile ingenua Cresson, 1878

Species of leafcutter bee (Megachile)

Megachile ingenua is a species of leafcutter bee in the family Megachilidae endemic to eastern North America.

== Distribution ==
M. ingenua is found in the U.S. states of Missouri, Illinois, Indiana, Virginia, North Carolina, Georgia, New Jersey, Pennsylvania, and Florida, as well as the Canadian province of Ontario.
