= Megachile pilosella =

Scientific classification
- Domain: Eukaryota
- Kingdom: Animalia
- Phylum: Arthropoda
- Class: Insecta
- Order: Hymenoptera
- Family: Megachilidae
- Genus: Megachile
- Species: M. pilosella

Binomial name
- Megachile pilosella Friese, 1922

Synonyms
- Megachile boswendica Cockerell, 1931; Megachile fuscorufa Cockerell, 1933; Megachile fuscarufa Cockerell, 1933 (Misspelling); Megachile rubrociliata Pasteels, 1965; Megachile rufisetosa Pasteels, 1976

Species of leafcutter bee (Megachile)

Megachile pilosella is a species of bee in the family Megachilidae. It was described by Friese in 1922.
