= Megachile guaranitica =

Scientific classification
- Domain: Eukaryota
- Kingdom: Animalia
- Phylum: Arthropoda
- Class: Insecta
- Order: Hymenoptera
- Family: Megachilidae
- Genus: Megachile
- Species: M. guaranitica

Binomial name
- Megachile guaranitica Schrottky, 1908

Synonyms
- Megachile gomphrenae var. ferrugineipes Friese, 1908; Megachile guaranitica f. melanopyga Schrottky, 1908; Megachile guaranitica uruguayensis Schrottky, 1908; Megachile marcida Vachal, 1908

Species of leafcutter bee (Megachile)

Megachile guaranitica is a species of bee in the family Megachilidae. It was described by Schrottky in 1908.
