= Megachile basalis =

Scientific classification
- Domain: Eukaryota
- Kingdom: Animalia
- Phylum: Arthropoda
- Class: Insecta
- Order: Hymenoptera
- Family: Megachilidae
- Genus: Megachile
- Species: M. basalis

Binomial name
- Megachile basalis Smith, 1853

Synonyms
- Megachile damaraensis Friese, 1904; Megachile latimetatarsis Strand, 1911; Megachile ungulata var. waterbergensis Strand, 1911; Megachile bevisi Cockerell, 1920; Megachile rozenii Pasteels, 1976

Species of leafcutter bee (Megachile)

Megachile basalis is a species of bee in the family Megachilidae. It was described by Smith in 1853.
