= Megachile ungulata =

Scientific classification
- Domain: Eukaryota
- Kingdom: Animalia
- Phylum: Arthropoda
- Class: Insecta
- Order: Hymenoptera
- Family: Megachilidae
- Genus: Megachile
- Species: M. ungulata

Binomial name
- Megachile ungulata Smith, 1853

Synonyms
- Megachile apiformis Smith, 1853; Megachile corneipalmis Vachal, 1910; Megachile rufibasis Cockerell, 1931; Megachile umtaliensis Cockerell, 1933

Species of leafcutter bee (Megachile)

Megachile ungulata is a species of bee in the family Megachilidae. It was described by Smith in 1853.
