= Megachile zapoteca =

Scientific classification
- Domain: Eukaryota
- Kingdom: Animalia
- Phylum: Arthropoda
- Class: Insecta
- Order: Hymenoptera
- Family: Megachilidae
- Genus: Megachile
- Species: M. zapoteca

Binomial name
- Megachile zapoteca Cresson, 1878

Synonyms
- Megachile bidentata Smith, 1853 (Homonym); Megachile tuxtla Cresson, 1878; Megachile bidens Friese, 1911

Species of leafcutter bee (Megachile)

Megachile zapoteca is a species of bee in the family Megachilidae. It was described by Smith in 1853, and renamed by Cresson in 1878.
