= Megachile zambesica =

Scientific classification
- Domain: Eukaryota
- Kingdom: Animalia
- Phylum: Arthropoda
- Class: Insecta
- Order: Hymenoptera
- Family: Megachilidae
- Genus: Megachile
- Species: M. zambesica

Binomial name
- Megachile zambesica Pasteels, 1965

Synonyms
- Megachile zambezica Eardley & Urban, 2010 (Misspelling)

Species of leafcutter bee (Megachile)

Megachile zambesica is a species of bee in the family Megachilidae. It was described by Pasteels in 1965. The name is a junior homonym of Megachile zambesica Cockerell, named in 1937.
