= Megachile barbata =

Scientific classification
- Domain: Eukaryota
- Kingdom: Animalia
- Phylum: Arthropoda
- Class: Insecta
- Order: Hymenoptera
- Family: Megachilidae
- Genus: Megachile
- Species: M. barbata

Binomial name
- Megachile barbata Smith, 1853

Synonyms
- Amegachile nasutula Brauns, 1912; Megachile coelostoma Cockerell, 1932; Megachile discretula nitidicauda Cockerell, 1937

Species of leafcutter bee (Megachile)

Megachile barbata is a species of bee in the family Megachilidae. It was described by Smith in 1853.
