= Megachile bahamensis =

Conservation status
- Imperiled (NatureServe)

Scientific classification
- Domain: Eukaryota
- Kingdom: Animalia
- Phylum: Arthropoda
- Class: Insecta
- Order: Hymenoptera
- Family: Megachilidae
- Genus: Megachile
- Species: M. bahamensis

Binomial name
- Megachile bahamensis Mitchell, 1927

Species of leafcutter bee (Megachile)

Megachile bahamensis is a species of bee in the family Megachilidae. It was described by Mitchell in 1927.

== Distribution ==
Southern Florida and the Bahamas from March to October.
