= Megachile dariensis =

Scientific classification
- Domain: Eukaryota
- Kingdom: Animalia
- Phylum: Arthropoda
- Class: Insecta
- Order: Hymenoptera
- Family: Megachilidae
- Genus: Megachile
- Species: M. dariensis

Binomial name
- Megachile dariensis Pasteels, 1965

Synonyms
- Megachile metatarsalis Friese, 1903 (Homonym)

Species of leafcutter bee (Megachile)

Megachile dariensis is a species of bee in the family Megachilidae. It was described by Friese in 1903, and renamed by Pasteels in 1965.
