= Megachile cyanescens =

Scientific classification
- Domain: Eukaryota
- Kingdom: Animalia
- Phylum: Arthropoda
- Class: Insecta
- Order: Hymenoptera
- Family: Megachilidae
- Genus: Megachile
- Species: M. cyanescens

Binomial name
- Megachile cyanescens Friese, 1904

Synonyms
- Megachile okanjandica Strand, 1911; Megachile vittatula Cockerell, 1920

Species of leafcutter bee (Megachile)

Megachile cyanescens is a species of bee in the family Megachilidae. It was described by Friese in 1904.
