= Megachile familiaris =

Scientific classification
- Kingdom: Animalia
- Phylum: Arthropoda
- Class: Insecta
- Order: Hymenoptera
- Family: Megachilidae
- Genus: Megachile
- Species: M. familiaris

Binomial name
- Megachile familiaris Cockerell, 1916

Synonyms
- Megachile luteola Pasteels, 1965; Megachile stellensis Pasteels, 1965

Species of leafcutter bee (Megachile)

Megachile familiaris is a species of bee in the family Megachilidae. It was described by Theodore Dru Alison Cockerell in 1916.
