= Megachile laminopeds =

Scientific classification
- Domain: Eukaryota
- Kingdom: Animalia
- Phylum: Arthropoda
- Class: Insecta
- Order: Hymenoptera
- Family: Megachilidae
- Genus: Megachile
- Species: M. laminopeds

Binomial name
- Megachile laminopeds Wu, 2005

Synonyms
- Megachile laminopes Wu, 2006 (Misspelling)

Species of leafcutter bee (Megachile)

Megachile laminopeds is a species of bee in the family Megachilidae. It was described by Yan-Ru Wu in 2005.
