= Megachile futilis =

Scientific classification
- Domain: Eukaryota
- Kingdom: Animalia
- Phylum: Arthropoda
- Class: Insecta
- Order: Hymenoptera
- Family: Megachilidae
- Genus: Megachile
- Species: M. futilis

Binomial name
- Megachile futilis Mitchell, 1930

Species of leafcutter bee (Megachile)

Megachile futilis is a species of bee in the family Megachilidae (Leafcutting Bees) and order Hymenoptera (Ants, Bees, Sawflies and Wasps). It was described by Mitchell in 1930.
