= Megachile kirbyana =

Scientific classification
- Kingdom: Animalia
- Phylum: Arthropoda
- Class: Insecta
- Order: Hymenoptera
- Family: Megachilidae
- Genus: Megachile
- Species: M. kirbyana

Binomial name
- Megachile kirbyana Cockerell, 1906

Species of leafcutter bee (Megachile)

Megachile kirbyana is a species of bee in the family Megachilidae. It was described by Theodore Dru Alison Cockerell in 1906, from a specimen collected in Fremantle.

In Australia, it is found only in Western Australia.
