= Megachile pseudonigra =

Conservation status
- Vulnerable (NatureServe)

Scientific classification
- Domain: Eukaryota
- Kingdom: Animalia
- Phylum: Arthropoda
- Class: Insecta
- Order: Hymenoptera
- Family: Megachilidae
- Genus: Megachile
- Species: M. pseudonigra

Binomial name
- Megachile pseudonigra Mitchell, 1927

Species of leafcutter bee (Megachile)

Megachile pseudonigra is a species of bee in the family Megachilidae. It was described by Mitchell in 1927.
