= Megachile stoddardensis =

Conservation status
- Vulnerable (NatureServe)

Scientific classification
- Domain: Eukaryota
- Kingdom: Animalia
- Phylum: Arthropoda
- Class: Insecta
- Order: Hymenoptera
- Family: Megachilidae
- Genus: Megachile
- Species: M. stoddardensis

Binomial name
- Megachile stoddardensis Mitchell, 1957

Species of leafcutter bee (Megachile)

Megachile stoddardensis is a species of bee in the family Megachilidae. It was described by Mitchell in 1957.
