= Megachile tricolor =

Scientific classification
- Domain: Eukaryota
- Kingdom: Animalia
- Phylum: Arthropoda
- Class: Insecta
- Order: Hymenoptera
- Family: Megachilidae
- Genus: Megachile
- Species: M. tricolor

Binomial name
- Megachile tricolor Pasteels, 1970

Species of leafcutter bee (Megachile)

Megachile tricolor is a species of bee in the family Megachilidae. It was described by Pasteels in 1970. The name is a junior homonym of Megachile tricolor Friese, published in 1903.
