= Megachile dakotensis =

Conservation status
- Imperiled (NatureServe)

Scientific classification
- Domain: Eukaryota
- Kingdom: Animalia
- Phylum: Arthropoda
- Class: Insecta
- Order: Hymenoptera
- Family: Megachilidae
- Genus: Megachile
- Species: M. dakotensis

Binomial name
- Megachile dakotensis Mitchell, 1926

Species of leafcutter bee (Megachile)

Megachile dakotensis is a species of bee in the family Megachilidae that inhabits the Midwestern United States.
