= Megachile hypopyrrha =

Scientific classification
- Domain: Eukaryota
- Kingdom: Animalia
- Phylum: Arthropoda
- Class: Insecta
- Order: Hymenoptera
- Family: Megachilidae
- Genus: Megachile
- Species: M. hypopyrrha

Binomial name
- Megachile hypopyrrha Cockerell, 1937

Species of leafcutter bee (Megachile)

Megachile hypopyrrha is a species of bee in the family Megachilidae. It was described by Theodore Dru Alison Cockerell in 1937.
