= Megachile palmensis =

Conservation status
- Vulnerable (NatureServe)

Scientific classification
- Domain: Eukaryota
- Kingdom: Animalia
- Phylum: Arthropoda
- Class: Insecta
- Order: Hymenoptera
- Family: Megachilidae
- Genus: Megachile
- Species: M. palmensis

Binomial name
- Megachile palmensis Mitchell, 1934

Species of leafcutter bee (Megachile)

Megachile palmensis is a species of bee in the family Megachilidae. It was described by Mitchell in 1934.
