= Megachile melanderi =

Conservation status
- Imperiled (NatureServe)

Scientific classification
- Domain: Eukaryota
- Kingdom: Animalia
- Phylum: Arthropoda
- Class: Insecta
- Order: Hymenoptera
- Family: Megachilidae
- Genus: Megachile
- Species: M. melanderi

Binomial name
- Megachile melanderi Mitchell, 1944

Species of leafcutter bee (Megachile)

Megachile melanderi is a species of bee in the family Megachilidae. It was described by Mitchell in 1944.
