= Megachile turbulenta =

Scientific classification
- Domain: Eukaryota
- Kingdom: Animalia
- Phylum: Arthropoda
- Class: Insecta
- Order: Hymenoptera
- Family: Megachilidae
- Genus: Megachile
- Species: M. turbulenta

Binomial name
- Megachile turbulenta Mitchell, 1930

Species of leafcutter bee

Megachile turbulenta is an invalid species of bee in the family Megachilidae. M. turbulent was described by Mitchell in 1930. Megachile turbulenta has no common name.
