= Megachile muansae =

Scientific classification
- Domain: Eukaryota
- Kingdom: Animalia
- Phylum: Arthropoda
- Class: Insecta
- Order: Hymenoptera
- Family: Megachilidae
- Genus: Megachile
- Species: M. muansae

Binomial name
- Megachile muansae Friese, 1911

Synonyms
- Megachile leucospilura Cockerell, 1937

Species of leafcutter bee (Megachile)

Megachile muansae is a species of bee in the family Megachilidae. It was described by Friese in 1911.
