= Megachile conjunctiformis =

Scientific classification
- Domain: Eukaryota
- Kingdom: Animalia
- Phylum: Arthropoda
- Class: Insecta
- Order: Hymenoptera
- Family: Megachilidae
- Genus: Megachile
- Species: M. conjunctiformis

Binomial name
- Megachile conjunctiformis Yasumatsu, 1938

Species of leafcutter bee (Megachile)

Megachile conjunctiformis is a species of bee in the family Megachilidae. It was described by Yasumatsu in 1938.
