= Megachile fulvofasciata =

Scientific classification
- Domain: Eukaryota
- Kingdom: Animalia
- Phylum: Arthropoda
- Class: Insecta
- Order: Hymenoptera
- Family: Megachilidae
- Genus: Megachile
- Species: M. fulvofasciata

Binomial name
- Megachile fulvofasciata Radoszkowski, 1882

Species of leafcutter bee (Megachile)

Megachile fulvofasciata is a species of bee in the family Megachilidae. It was described by Radoszkowski in 1882.
