= Megachile indica =

Scientific classification
- Domain: Eukaryota
- Kingdom: Animalia
- Phylum: Arthropoda
- Class: Insecta
- Order: Hymenoptera
- Family: Megachilidae
- Genus: Megachile
- Species: M. indica

Binomial name
- Megachile indica (Gupta, 1988)

Synonyms
- Cressoniella indica Gupta, 1988

Species of leafcutter bee (Megachile)

Megachile indica is a species of bee in the family Megachilidae. It was described by Gupta in 1988.
