= Megachile tutuilae =

Scientific classification
- Domain: Eukaryota
- Kingdom: Animalia
- Phylum: Arthropoda
- Class: Insecta
- Order: Hymenoptera
- Family: Megachilidae
- Genus: Megachile
- Species: M. tutuilae

Binomial name
- Megachile tutuilae Perkins & Cheesman, 1928

Species of leafcutter bee (Megachile)

Megachile tutuilae is a species of bee in the family Megachilidae. It was described by Perkins & Cheesman in 1928.
