= Megachile flavihirsuta =

Scientific classification
- Domain: Eukaryota
- Kingdom: Animalia
- Phylum: Arthropoda
- Class: Insecta
- Order: Hymenoptera
- Family: Megachilidae
- Genus: Megachile
- Species: M. flavihirsuta

Binomial name
- Megachile flavihirsuta Mitchell, 1930

Species of leafcutter bee (Megachile)

Megachile flavihirsuta is a species of bee in the family Megachilidae. It was described by Mitchell in 1930.
