= Megachile gibboclypearis =

Scientific classification
- Domain: Eukaryota
- Kingdom: Animalia
- Phylum: Arthropoda
- Class: Insecta
- Order: Hymenoptera
- Family: Megachilidae
- Genus: Megachile
- Species: M. gibboclypearis

Binomial name
- Megachile gibboclypearis Pasteels, 1979

Species of leafcutter bee (Megachile)

Megachile gibboclypearis is a species of bee in the family Megachilidae. It was described by Pasteels in 1979.
