= Megachile pseudomonticola =

Scientific classification
- Domain: Eukaryota
- Kingdom: Animalia
- Phylum: Arthropoda
- Class: Insecta
- Order: Hymenoptera
- Family: Megachilidae
- Genus: Megachile
- Species: M. pseudomonticola

Binomial name
- Megachile pseudomonticola Hedicke, 1925

Species of leafcutter bee (Megachile)

Megachile pseudomonticola is a species of bee in the family Megachilidae. It was described by Hedicke in 1925.
