= Megachile schmiedeknechti =

Scientific classification
- Domain: Eukaryota
- Kingdom: Animalia
- Phylum: Arthropoda
- Class: Insecta
- Order: Hymenoptera
- Family: Megachilidae
- Genus: Megachile
- Species: M. schmiedeknechti

Binomial name
- Megachile schmiedeknechti Costa, 1884

Species of leafcutter bee (Megachile)

Megachile schmiedeknechti is a species of bee in the family Megachilidae. It was described by Costa in 1884.
