= Megachile tenuitarsis =

Scientific classification
- Domain: Eukaryota
- Kingdom: Animalia
- Phylum: Arthropoda
- Class: Insecta
- Order: Hymenoptera
- Family: Megachilidae
- Genus: Megachile
- Species: M. tenuitarsis

Binomial name
- Megachile tenuitarsis Schrottky, 1920

Species of leafcutter bee (Megachile)

Megachile tenuitarsis is a species of bee in the family Megachilidae. It was described by Schrottky in 1920.
