= Megachile tsimbazazae =

Scientific classification
- Domain: Eukaryota
- Kingdom: Animalia
- Phylum: Arthropoda
- Class: Insecta
- Order: Hymenoptera
- Family: Megachilidae
- Genus: Megachile
- Species: M. tsimbazazae

Binomial name
- Megachile tsimbazazae (Pauly, 2001)

Species of leafcutter bee (Megachile)

Megachile tsimbazazae is a species of bee in the family Megachilidae. It was described by Pauly in 2001.
