= Megachile nigroscopula =

Scientific classification
- Domain: Eukaryota
- Kingdom: Animalia
- Phylum: Arthropoda
- Class: Insecta
- Order: Hymenoptera
- Family: Megachilidae
- Genus: Megachile
- Species: M. nigroscopula

Binomial name
- Megachile nigroscopula Wu, 1982

Species of leafcutter bee (Megachile)

Megachile nigroscopula is a species of bee in the family Megachilidae. It was described by Yan-Ru Wu in 1982.
