= Megachile barkeri =

Scientific classification
- Domain: Eukaryota
- Kingdom: Animalia
- Phylum: Arthropoda
- Class: Insecta
- Order: Hymenoptera
- Family: Megachilidae
- Genus: Megachile
- Species: M. barkeri

Binomial name
- Megachile barkeri Cockerell, 1920

Species of leafcutter bee (Megachile)

Megachile barkeri is a species of bee in the family Megachilidae. It was described by Theodore Dru Alison Cockerell in 1920.
