= Megachile meadewaldoi =

Scientific classification
- Domain: Eukaryota
- Kingdom: Animalia
- Phylum: Arthropoda
- Class: Insecta
- Order: Hymenoptera
- Family: Megachilidae
- Genus: Megachile
- Species: M. meadewaldoi

Binomial name
- Megachile meadewaldoi Brauns, 1912

Species of leafcutter bee (Megachile)

Megachile meadewaldoi is a species of bee in the family Megachilidae. It was described by Brauns in 1912.
