= Megachile albimarginalis =

Scientific classification
- Domain: Eukaryota
- Kingdom: Animalia
- Phylum: Arthropoda
- Class: Insecta
- Order: Hymenoptera
- Family: Megachilidae
- Genus: Megachile
- Species: M. albimarginalis

Binomial name
- Megachile albimarginalis Rebmann, 1970

Species of leafcutter bee (Megachile)

Megachile albimarginalis is a species of bee in the family Megachilidae. It was described by Rebmann in 1970.
