= Megachile crotalariae =

Scientific classification
- Domain: Eukaryota
- Kingdom: Animalia
- Phylum: Arthropoda
- Class: Insecta
- Order: Hymenoptera
- Family: Megachilidae
- Genus: Megachile
- Species: M. crotalariae

Binomial name
- Megachile crotalariae (Schwimmer, 1980)

Species of leafcutter bee (Megachile)

Megachile crotalariae is a species of bee in the family Megachilidae. It was described by Schwimmer in 1980.
