= Megachile seraxensis =

Scientific classification
- Domain: Eukaryota
- Kingdom: Animalia
- Phylum: Arthropoda
- Class: Insecta
- Order: Hymenoptera
- Family: Megachilidae
- Genus: Megachile
- Species: M. seraxensis

Binomial name
- Megachile seraxensis Radoszkowski, 1893

Species of leafcutter bee (Megachile)

Megachile seraxensis is a species of bee in the family Megachilidae. It was described by Radoszkowski in 1893.
