= Megachile vandeveldii =

Scientific classification
- Domain: Eukaryota
- Kingdom: Animalia
- Phylum: Arthropoda
- Class: Insecta
- Order: Hymenoptera
- Family: Megachilidae
- Genus: Megachile
- Species: M. vandeveldii

Binomial name
- Megachile vandeveldii (Meunier, 1888)

Species of leafcutter bee (Megachile)

Megachile vandeveldii is a species of bee in the family Megachilidae. It was described by Meunier in 1888.
