= Megachile rubtzovi =

Scientific classification
- Kingdom: Animalia
- Phylum: Arthropoda
- Class: Insecta
- Order: Hymenoptera
- Family: Megachilidae
- Genus: Megachile
- Species: M. rubtzovi

Binomial name
- Megachile rubtzovi Cockerell, 1928

Species of leafcutter bee (Megachile)

Megachile rubtzovi is a species of bee in the family Megachilidae. It was described by Theodore Dru Alison Cockerell in 1928.-
