= Megachile sphenapis =

Scientific classification
- Domain: Eukaryota
- Kingdom: Animalia
- Phylum: Arthropoda
- Class: Insecta
- Order: Hymenoptera
- Family: Megachilidae
- Genus: Megachile
- Species: M. sphenapis

Binomial name
- Megachile sphenapis Wu, 2005

Species of leafcutter bee (Megachile)

Megachile sphenapis is a species of bee in the family Megachilidae. It was described by Yan-Ru Wu in 2005.
