= Megachile ainu =

Scientific classification
- Domain: Eukaryota
- Kingdom: Animalia
- Phylum: Arthropoda
- Class: Insecta
- Order: Hymenoptera
- Family: Megachilidae
- Genus: Megachile
- Species: M. ainu

Binomial name
- Megachile ainu Hirashima & Maeta, 1974

Species of leafcutter bee (Megachile)

Megachile ainu is a species of bee in the family Megachilidae. It was described by Hirashima & Maeta in 1974.
