= Megachile arundinacea =

Scientific classification
- Domain: Eukaryota
- Kingdom: Animalia
- Phylum: Arthropoda
- Class: Insecta
- Order: Hymenoptera
- Family: Megachilidae
- Genus: Megachile
- Species: M. arundinacea

Binomial name
- Megachile arundinacea Taschenberg, 1872

Species of leafcutter bee (Megachile)

Megachile arundinacea is a species of bee in the family Megachilidae. It was described by Taschenberg in 1872.
