= Megachile aurantipennis =

Scientific classification
- Kingdom: Animalia
- Phylum: Arthropoda
- Class: Insecta
- Order: Hymenoptera
- Family: Megachilidae
- Genus: Megachile
- Species: M. aurantipennis

Binomial name
- Megachile aurantipennis Cockerell, 1912

Species of leafcutter bee (Megachile)

Megachile aurantipennis is a species of bee in the family Megachilidae. It was described by Theodore Dru Alison Cockerell in 1912.
