= Megachile auriceps =

Scientific classification
- Domain: Eukaryota
- Kingdom: Animalia
- Phylum: Arthropoda
- Class: Insecta
- Order: Hymenoptera
- Family: Megachilidae
- Genus: Megachile
- Species: M. auriceps

Binomial name
- Megachile auriceps Meade-Waldo, 1914

Species of leafcutter bee (Megachile)

Megachile auriceps is a species of bee in the family Megachilidae. It was described by Meade-Waldo in 1914.
