= Megachile battorensis =

Scientific classification
- Domain: Eukaryota
- Kingdom: Animalia
- Phylum: Arthropoda
- Class: Insecta
- Order: Hymenoptera
- Family: Megachilidae
- Genus: Megachile
- Species: M. battorensis

Binomial name
- Megachile battorensis Meade-Waldo, 1912

Species of leafcutter bee (Megachile)

Megachile battorensis is a species of bee in the family Megachilidae. It was described by Meade-Waldo in 1912.
