= Megachile bougainvillei =

Scientific classification
- Kingdom: Animalia
- Phylum: Arthropoda
- Class: Insecta
- Order: Hymenoptera
- Family: Megachilidae
- Genus: Megachile
- Species: M. bougainvillei

Binomial name
- Megachile bougainvillei Cockerell, 1911

Species of leafcutter bee (Megachile)

Megachile bougainvillei is a species of bee in the family Megachilidae. It was described by Theodore Dru Alison Cockerell in 1911.
