= Megachile decemsignata =

Scientific classification
- Domain: Eukaryota
- Kingdom: Animalia
- Phylum: Arthropoda
- Class: Insecta
- Order: Hymenoptera
- Family: Megachilidae
- Genus: Megachile
- Species: M. decemsignata

Binomial name
- Megachile decemsignata Radozskowski, 1881

Species of leafcutter bee (Megachile)

Megachile decemsignata is a species of bee in the family Megachilidae. It was described by Radozskowski in 1881.
