= Megachile grandibarbis =

Scientific classification
- Domain: Eukaryota
- Kingdom: Animalia
- Phylum: Arthropoda
- Class: Insecta
- Order: Hymenoptera
- Family: Megachilidae
- Genus: Megachile
- Species: M. grandibarbis

Binomial name
- Megachile grandibarbis Pérez, 1899

Species of leafcutter bee (Megachile)

Megachile grandibarbis is a species of bee in the family Megachilidae. It was described by Pérez in 1899.
