= Megachile leucopogonata =

Scientific classification
- Domain: Eukaryota
- Kingdom: Animalia
- Phylum: Arthropoda
- Class: Insecta
- Order: Hymenoptera
- Family: Megachilidae
- Genus: Megachile
- Species: M. leucopogonata

Binomial name
- Megachile leucopogonata (Dours, 1873)

Species of leafcutter bee (Megachile)

Megachile leucopogonata is a species of bee in the family Megachilidae. It was described by Dours in 1873.
