= Megachile rufiscopa =

Scientific classification
- Domain: Eukaryota
- Kingdom: Animalia
- Phylum: Arthropoda
- Class: Insecta
- Order: Hymenoptera
- Family: Megachilidae
- Genus: Megachile
- Species: M. rufiscopa

Binomial name
- Megachile rufiscopa Saussure, 1890

Species of leafcutter bee (Megachile)

Megachile rufiscopa is a species of bee in the family Megachilidae. It was described by Saussure in 1890.
