= Megachile suffusipennis =

Scientific classification
- Kingdom: Animalia
- Phylum: Arthropoda
- Class: Insecta
- Order: Hymenoptera
- Family: Megachilidae
- Genus: Megachile
- Species: M. suffusipennis

Binomial name
- Megachile suffusipennis Cockerell, 1906

Species of leafcutter bee (Megachile)

Megachile suffusipennis is a species of bee in the family Megachilidae. It was described by Theodore Dru Alison Cockerell in 1906.
