= Megachile ventralis =

Scientific classification
- Domain: Eukaryota
- Kingdom: Animalia
- Phylum: Arthropoda
- Class: Insecta
- Order: Hymenoptera
- Family: Megachilidae
- Genus: Megachile
- Species: M. ventralis

Binomial name
- Megachile ventralis Smith, 1860

Species of leafcutter bee (Megachile)

Megachile ventralis is a species of bee in the family Megachilidae, or "leafcutter bees". It was described by Smith in 1860.
