= Megachile albifasciata =

Scientific classification
- Domain: Eukaryota
- Kingdom: Animalia
- Phylum: Arthropoda
- Class: Insecta
- Order: Hymenoptera
- Family: Megachilidae
- Genus: Megachile
- Species: M. albifasciata

Binomial name
- Megachile albifasciata Rebmann, 1970

Species of leafcutter bee (Megachile)

Megachile albifasciata is a species of bee in the family Megachilidae. It was described by Rebmann in 1970.
