= Megachile asahinai =

Scientific classification
- Domain: Eukaryota
- Kingdom: Animalia
- Phylum: Arthropoda
- Class: Insecta
- Order: Hymenoptera
- Family: Megachilidae
- Genus: Megachile
- Species: M. asahinai

Binomial name
- Megachile asahinai Yasumatsu, 1955

Species of leafcutter bee (Megachile)

Megachile asahinai is a species of bee in the family Megachilidae. It was described by Yasumatsu in 1955.
