= Megachile atahualpa =

Scientific classification
- Domain: Eukaryota
- Kingdom: Animalia
- Phylum: Arthropoda
- Class: Insecta
- Order: Hymenoptera
- Family: Megachilidae
- Genus: Megachile
- Species: M. atahualpa

Binomial name
- Megachile atahualpa Schrottky, 1913

Species of leafcutter bee (Megachile)

Megachile atahualpa is a species of bee in the family Megachilidae. It was described by Schrottky in 1913.
