= Megachile atropyga =

Scientific classification
- Domain: Eukaryota
- Kingdom: Animalia
- Phylum: Arthropoda
- Class: Insecta
- Order: Hymenoptera
- Family: Megachilidae
- Genus: Megachile
- Species: M. atropyga

Binomial name
- Megachile atropyga (van der Zanden, 1995)

Species of leafcutter bee (Megachile)

Megachile atropyga is a species of bee in the family Megachilidae. It was described by van der Zanden in 1995.
