= Megachile cincta =

Scientific classification
- Domain: Eukaryota
- Kingdom: Animalia
- Phylum: Arthropoda
- Class: Insecta
- Order: Hymenoptera
- Family: Megachilidae
- Genus: Megachile
- Species: M. cincta

Binomial name
- Megachile cincta (Fabricius, 1781)

Species of leafcutter bee (Megachile)

Megachile cincta is a species of bee in the family Megachilidae. It was described by Johan Christian Fabricius in 1781.
