= Megachile cockerelli =

Scientific classification
- Domain: Eukaryota
- Kingdom: Animalia
- Phylum: Arthropoda
- Class: Insecta
- Order: Hymenoptera
- Family: Megachilidae
- Genus: Megachile
- Species: M. cockerelli

Binomial name
- Megachile cockerelli Rohwer, 1923

Species of leafcutter bee (Megachile)

Megachile cockerelli is a species of bee in the family Megachilidae. It was described by Rohwer in 1923.
