= Megachile distinguenda =

Scientific classification
- Domain: Eukaryota
- Kingdom: Animalia
- Phylum: Arthropoda
- Class: Insecta
- Order: Hymenoptera
- Family: Megachilidae
- Genus: Megachile
- Species: M. distinguenda

Binomial name
- Megachile distinguenda Ruiz, 1941

Species of leafcutter bee (Megachile)

Megachile distinguenda is a species of bee in the family Megachilidae. It was described by Ruiz in 1941.
