= Megachile dohrandti =

Scientific classification
- Domain: Eukaryota
- Kingdom: Animalia
- Phylum: Arthropoda
- Class: Insecta
- Order: Hymenoptera
- Family: Megachilidae
- Genus: Megachile
- Species: M. dohrandti

Binomial name
- Megachile dohrandti Morawitz, 1880

Species of leafcutter bee (Megachile)

Megachile dohrandti is a species of bee in the family Megachilidae. It was described by Morawitz in 1880..
