= Megachile fuliginosa =

Scientific classification
- Domain: Eukaryota
- Kingdom: Animalia
- Phylum: Arthropoda
- Class: Insecta
- Order: Hymenoptera
- Family: Megachilidae
- Genus: Megachile
- Species: M. fuliginosa

Binomial name
- Megachile fuliginosa Friese, 1925

Species of leafcutter bee (Megachile)

Megachile fuliginosa is a species of bee in the family Megachilidae. It was described by Friese in 1925.
