= Megachile galactogagates =

Scientific classification
- Domain: Eukaryota
- Kingdom: Animalia
- Phylum: Arthropoda
- Class: Insecta
- Order: Hymenoptera
- Family: Megachilidae
- Genus: Megachile
- Species: M. galactogagates

Binomial name
- Megachile galactogagates Gribodo, 1894

Species of leafcutter bee (Megachile)

Megachile galactogagates is a species of bee in the family Megachilidae. It was described by Gribodo in 1894.
