= Megachile leucopsis =

Scientific classification
- Domain: Eukaryota
- Kingdom: Animalia
- Phylum: Arthropoda
- Class: Insecta
- Order: Hymenoptera
- Family: Megachilidae
- Genus: Megachile
- Species: M. leucopsis

Binomial name
- Megachile leucopsis Schletterer, 1891

Species of leafcutter bee (Megachile)

Megachile leucopsis is a species of bee in the family Megachilidae. It was described by Schletterer in 1891.
