= Megachile mastrucatella =

Scientific classification
- Domain: Eukaryota
- Kingdom: Animalia
- Phylum: Arthropoda
- Class: Insecta
- Order: Hymenoptera
- Family: Megachilidae
- Genus: Megachile
- Species: M. mastrucatella

Binomial name
- Megachile mastrucatella Strand, 1911

Species of leafcutter bee (Megachile)

Megachile mastrucatella is a species of bee in the family Megachilidae. It was described by Strand in 1911.
