= Megachile sublaurita =

Scientific classification
- Domain: Eukaryota
- Kingdom: Animalia
- Phylum: Arthropoda
- Class: Insecta
- Order: Hymenoptera
- Family: Megachilidae
- Genus: Megachile
- Species: M. sublaurita

Binomial name
- Megachile sublaurita Mitchell, 1927

Species of leafcutter bee (Megachile)

Megachile sublaurita is a species of bee in the family Megachilidae. It was described by Mitchell in 1927.
