= Megachile viridicollis =

Scientific classification
- Domain: Eukaryota
- Kingdom: Animalia
- Phylum: Arthropoda
- Class: Insecta
- Order: Hymenoptera
- Family: Megachilidae
- Genus: Megachile
- Species: M. viridicollis

Binomial name
- Megachile viridicollis Morawitz, 1875

Species of leafcutter bee (Megachile)

Megachile viridicollis is a species of bee in the family Megachilidae. It was described by Morawitz in 1875.
