= Megachile aurata =

Scientific classification
- Domain: Eukaryota
- Kingdom: Animalia
- Phylum: Arthropoda
- Class: Insecta
- Order: Hymenoptera
- Family: Megachilidae
- Genus: Megachile
- Species: M. aurata

Binomial name
- Megachile aurata Mitchell, 1930

Species of leafcutter bee (Megachile)

Megachile aurata is a species of bee in the family Megachilidae. It was described by Mitchell in 1930. It is found in South America.
