= Megachile disputabilis =

Scientific classification
- Domain: Eukaryota
- Kingdom: Animalia
- Phylum: Arthropoda
- Class: Insecta
- Order: Hymenoptera
- Family: Megachilidae
- Genus: Megachile
- Species: M. disputabilis

Binomial name
- Megachile disputabilis Krombein, 1951

Species of leafcutter bee (Megachile)

Megachile disputabilis is a species of bee in the family Megachilidae. It was described by Krombein in 1951.
