= Megachile heteroptera =

Scientific classification
- Domain: Eukaryota
- Kingdom: Animalia
- Phylum: Arthropoda
- Class: Insecta
- Order: Hymenoptera
- Family: Megachilidae
- Genus: Megachile
- Species: M. heteroptera

Binomial name
- Megachile heteroptera Sichel, 1867

Species of leafcutter bee (Megachile)

Megachile heteroptera is a species of bee in the family Megachilidae. It was described by Sichel in 1867.
