= Megachile paraensis =

Scientific classification
- Domain: Eukaryota
- Kingdom: Animalia
- Phylum: Arthropoda
- Class: Insecta
- Order: Hymenoptera
- Family: Megachilidae
- Genus: Megachile
- Species: M. paraensis

Binomial name
- Megachile paraensis Mocsáry, 1887

Species of leafcutter bee (Megachile)

Megachile paraensis is a species of bee in the family Megachilidae. It was described by Mocsáry in 1887.
