= Megachile portlandiana =

Scientific classification
- Domain: Eukaryota
- Kingdom: Animalia
- Phylum: Arthropoda
- Class: Insecta
- Order: Hymenoptera
- Family: Megachilidae
- Genus: Megachile
- Species: M. portlandiana

Binomial name
- Megachile portlandiana Rayment, 1953

Species of leafcutter bee (Megachile)

Megachile portlandiana is a species of bee in the family Megachilidae. It was described by Rayment in 1953.
