= Megachile reicherti =

Scientific classification
- Domain: Eukaryota
- Kingdom: Animalia
- Phylum: Arthropoda
- Class: Insecta
- Order: Hymenoptera
- Family: Megachilidae
- Genus: Megachile
- Species: M. reicherti

Binomial name
- Megachile reicherti Brauns, 1929

Species of leafcutter bee (Megachile)

Megachile reicherti is a species of bee in the family Megachilidae. It was described by Johannes Brahms in 1929.
