= Megachile sidalceae =

Scientific classification
- Kingdom: Animalia
- Phylum: Arthropoda
- Class: Insecta
- Order: Hymenoptera
- Family: Megachilidae
- Genus: Megachile
- Species: M. sidalceae

Binomial name
- Megachile sidalceae Cockerell, 1897

Species of leafcutter bee (Megachile)

Megachile sidalceae is a species of bee in the family Megachilidae. It was described by Theodore Dru Alison Cockerell in 1897.
