= Megachile trisecta =

Scientific classification
- Domain: Eukaryota
- Kingdom: Animalia
- Phylum: Arthropoda
- Class: Insecta
- Order: Hymenoptera
- Family: Megachilidae
- Genus: Megachile
- Species: M. trisecta

Binomial name
- Megachile trisecta (Pasteels, 1976)

Species of leafcutter bee (Megachile)

Megachile trisecta is a species of bee in the family Megachilidae. It was described by Pasteels in 1976.
