= Megachile albiceps =

Scientific classification
- Domain: Eukaryota
- Kingdom: Animalia
- Phylum: Arthropoda
- Class: Insecta
- Order: Hymenoptera
- Family: Megachilidae
- Genus: Megachile
- Species: M. albiceps

Binomial name
- Megachile albiceps Pasteels, 1903

Species of leafcutter bee (Megachile)

Megachile albiceps is a species of bee in the family Megachilidae. It was described by Pasteels in 1903.
