= Megachile auriculata =

Scientific classification
- Domain: Eukaryota
- Kingdom: Animalia
- Phylum: Arthropoda
- Class: Insecta
- Order: Hymenoptera
- Family: Megachilidae
- Genus: Megachile
- Species: M. auriculata

Binomial name
- Megachile auriculata (Gupta, 1989)

Species of leafcutter bee (Megachile)

Megachile auriculata is a species of bee in the family Megachilidae. It was described by Gupta in 1989.
