= Megachile carinata =

Scientific classification
- Domain: Eukaryota
- Kingdom: Animalia
- Phylum: Arthropoda
- Class: Insecta
- Order: Hymenoptera
- Family: Megachilidae
- Genus: Megachile
- Species: M. carinata

Binomial name
- Megachile carinata Radoszkowski, 1893

Species of leafcutter bee (Megachile)

Megachile carinata is a species of bee in the family Megachilidae. It was described by Radoszkowski in 1893.
