= Megachile cubiceps =

Scientific classification
- Domain: Eukaryota
- Kingdom: Animalia
- Phylum: Arthropoda
- Class: Insecta
- Order: Hymenoptera
- Family: Megachilidae
- Genus: Megachile
- Species: M. cubiceps

Binomial name
- Megachile cubiceps Friese, 1906

Species of leafcutter bee (Megachile)

Megachile cubiceps is a species of bee in the family Megachilidae. It was described by Friese in 1906.
