= Megachile esakii =

Scientific classification
- Domain: Eukaryota
- Kingdom: Animalia
- Phylum: Arthropoda
- Class: Insecta
- Order: Hymenoptera
- Family: Megachilidae
- Genus: Megachile
- Species: M. esakii

Binomial name
- Megachile esakii Yasumatsu, 1935

Species of leafcutter bee (Megachile)

Megachile esakii is a species of bee in the family Megachilidae. It was described by Yasumatsu in 1935.
