= Megachile quartinae =

Scientific classification
- Domain: Eukaryota
- Kingdom: Animalia
- Phylum: Arthropoda
- Class: Insecta
- Order: Hymenoptera
- Family: Megachilidae
- Genus: Megachile
- Species: M. quartinae

Binomial name
- Megachile quartinae Gribodo, 1884

Species of leafcutter bee (Megachile)

Megachile quartinae is a species of bee in the family Megachilidae. It was described by Gribodo in 1884.
