= Megachile sericans =

Scientific classification
- Domain: Eukaryota
- Kingdom: Animalia
- Phylum: Arthropoda
- Class: Insecta
- Order: Hymenoptera
- Family: Megachilidae
- Genus: Megachile
- Species: M. sericans

Binomial name
- Megachile sericans Fonscolombe, 1852

Species of leafcutter bee (Megachile)

Megachile sericans is a species of bee in the family Megachilidae. It was described by Fonscolombe in 1852.
