= Megachile zingowli =

Scientific classification
- Domain: Eukaryota
- Kingdom: Animalia
- Phylum: Arthropoda
- Class: Insecta
- Order: Hymenoptera
- Family: Megachilidae
- Genus: Megachile
- Species: M. zingowli

Binomial name
- Megachile zingowli Cheesman, 1936

Species of leafcutter bee (Megachile)

Megachile zingowli is a species of bee in the family Megachilidae. It was described by Cheesman in 1936.
