= Megachile cestifera =

Scientific classification
- Domain: Eukaryota
- Kingdom: Animalia
- Phylum: Arthropoda
- Class: Insecta
- Order: Hymenoptera
- Family: Megachilidae
- Genus: Megachile
- Species: M. cestifera

Binomial name
- Megachile cestifera Benoist, 1954

Species of leafcutter bee (Megachile)

Megachile cestifera is a species of bee in the family Megachilidae. It was described by Benoist in 1954.
