= Megachile chilensis =

Scientific classification
- Domain: Eukaryota
- Kingdom: Animalia
- Phylum: Arthropoda
- Class: Insecta
- Order: Hymenoptera
- Family: Megachilidae
- Genus: Megachile
- Species: M. chilensis

Binomial name
- Megachile chilensis Spinola, 1851

Species of leafcutter bee (Megachile)

Megachile chilensis is a species of bee in the family Megachilidae. It was described by Spinola in 1851.
