= Megachile larochei =

Scientific classification
- Domain: Eukaryota
- Kingdom: Animalia
- Phylum: Arthropoda
- Class: Insecta
- Order: Hymenoptera
- Family: Megachilidae
- Genus: Megachile
- Species: M. larochei

Binomial name
- Megachile larochei Tkalcu, 1994

Species of leafcutter bee (Megachile)

Megachile larochei is a species of bee in the family Megachilidae. It was described by Tkalcu in 1994.
