= Megachile luctifera =

Scientific classification
- Domain: Eukaryota
- Kingdom: Animalia
- Phylum: Arthropoda
- Class: Insecta
- Order: Hymenoptera
- Family: Megachilidae
- Genus: Megachile
- Species: M. luctifera

Binomial name
- Megachile luctifera Spinola, 1841

Species of leafcutter bee (Megachile)

Megachile luctifera is a species of bee in the family Megachilidae. It was described by Spinola in 1841.
