= Megachile mediana =

Scientific classification
- Domain: Eukaryota
- Kingdom: Animalia
- Phylum: Arthropoda
- Class: Insecta
- Order: Hymenoptera
- Family: Megachilidae
- Genus: Megachile
- Species: M. mediana

Binomial name
- Megachile mediana (Pasteels, 1965)

Species of leafcutter bee (Megachile)

Megachile mediana is a species of bee in the family Megachilidae. It was described by Pasteels in 1965.
