= Megachile nipponica =

Scientific classification
- Kingdom: Animalia
- Phylum: Arthropoda
- Class: Insecta
- Order: Hymenoptera
- Family: Megachilidae
- Genus: Megachile
- Species: M. nipponica

Binomial name
- Megachile nipponica Cockerell, 1914

Species of leafcutter bee (Megachile)

Megachile nipponica is a species of bee in the family Megachilidae. It was described by Theodore Dru Alison Cockerell in 1914.
