= Megachile paulista =

Scientific classification
- Domain: Eukaryota
- Kingdom: Animalia
- Phylum: Arthropoda
- Class: Insecta
- Order: Hymenoptera
- Family: Megachilidae
- Genus: Megachile
- Species: M. paulista

Binomial name
- Megachile paulista (Schrottky, 1920)

Species of leafcutter bee (Megachile)

Megachile paulista is a species of bee in the family Megachilidae. It was described by Schrottky in 1920.
