= Megachile praetexta =

Scientific classification
- Domain: Eukaryota
- Kingdom: Animalia
- Phylum: Arthropoda
- Class: Insecta
- Order: Hymenoptera
- Family: Megachilidae
- Genus: Megachile
- Species: M. praetexta

Binomial name
- Megachile praetexta Vachal, 1910

Species of leafcutter bee (Megachile)

Megachile praetexta is a species of bee in the family Megachilidae. It was described by Vachal in 1910.
