= Megachile semivestita =

Scientific classification
- Domain: Eukaryota
- Kingdom: Animalia
- Phylum: Arthropoda
- Class: Insecta
- Order: Hymenoptera
- Family: Megachilidae
- Genus: Megachile
- Species: M. semivestita

Binomial name
- Megachile semivestita (Smith, 1853)

Species of leafcutter bee (Megachile)

Megachile semivestita is a species of bee in the family Megachilidae. It was described by Smith in 1853.
