= Megachile susurrans =

Scientific classification
- Domain: Eukaryota
- Kingdom: Animalia
- Phylum: Arthropoda
- Class: Insecta
- Order: Hymenoptera
- Family: Megachilidae
- Genus: Megachile
- Species: M. susurrans

Binomial name
- Megachile susurrans Haliday, 1836

Species of leafcutter bee (Megachile)

Megachile susurrans is a species of bee in the family Megachilidae. It was described by Haliday in 1836.
