= Megachile ulrica =

Scientific classification
- Domain: Eukaryota
- Kingdom: Animalia
- Phylum: Arthropoda
- Class: Insecta
- Order: Hymenoptera
- Family: Megachilidae
- Genus: Megachile
- Species: M. ulrica

Binomial name
- Megachile ulrica Nurse, 1901

Species of leafcutter bee (Megachile)

Megachile ulrica is a species of bee in the family Megachilidae. It was described by Nurse in 1901.
