= Megachile catamarcensis =

Scientific classification
- Domain: Eukaryota
- Kingdom: Animalia
- Phylum: Arthropoda
- Class: Insecta
- Order: Hymenoptera
- Family: Megachilidae
- Genus: Megachile
- Species: M. catamarcensis

Binomial name
- Megachile catamarcensis Schrottky, 1908

Species of bee

Megachile catamarcensis is a species of bee in the family Megachilidae. It was described by Schrottky in 1908.
