= Megachile privigna =

Scientific classification
- Kingdom: Animalia
- Phylum: Arthropoda
- Clade: Pancrustacea
- Class: Insecta
- Order: Hymenoptera
- Family: Megachilidae
- Genus: Megachile
- Species: M. privigna

Binomial name
- Megachile privigna Rebmann, 1968

Species of leafcutter bee (Megachile)

Megachile privigna is a species of bee in the family Megachilidae. It was described by Rebmann in 1968.
