= Megachile abessinica =

Scientific classification
- Domain: Eukaryota
- Kingdom: Animalia
- Phylum: Arthropoda
- Class: Insecta
- Order: Hymenoptera
- Family: Megachilidae
- Genus: Megachile
- Species: M. abessinica

Binomial name
- Megachile abessinica Friese, 1915

Species of leafcutter bee (Megachile)

Megachile abessinica is a species of bee in the family Megachilidae. It was described by Friese in 1915.
