= Megachile coniformis =

Scientific classification
- Domain: Eukaryota
- Kingdom: Animalia
- Phylum: Arthropoda
- Class: Insecta
- Order: Hymenoptera
- Family: Megachilidae
- Genus: Megachile
- Species: M. coniformis

Binomial name
- Megachile coniformis Friese, 1922

Species of leafcutter bee (Megachile)

Megachile coniformis is a species of bee in the family Megachilidae. It was described by Friese in 1922.
