= Megachile pedalis =

Scientific classification
- Domain: Eukaryota
- Kingdom: Animalia
- Phylum: Arthropoda
- Class: Insecta
- Order: Hymenoptera
- Family: Megachilidae
- Genus: Megachile
- Species: M. pedalis

Binomial name
- Megachile pedalis Fox, 1891

Species of leafcutter bee (Megachile)

Megachile pedalis is a species of bee in the family Megachilidae. It was described by Fox in 1891.
