= Megachile riojana =

Scientific classification
- Domain: Eukaryota
- Kingdom: Animalia
- Phylum: Arthropoda
- Class: Insecta
- Order: Hymenoptera
- Family: Megachilidae
- Genus: Megachile
- Species: M. riojana

Binomial name
- Megachile riojana Schrottky, 1920

Species of leafcutter bee (Megachile)

Megachile riojana is a species of bee in the family Megachilidae. It was described by Schrottky in 1920.
