= Megachile villipes =

Scientific classification
- Domain: Eukaryota
- Kingdom: Animalia
- Phylum: Arthropoda
- Class: Insecta
- Order: Hymenoptera
- Family: Megachilidae
- Genus: Megachile
- Species: M. villipes

Binomial name
- Megachile villipes Morawitz, 1875

Species of leafcutter bee (Megachile)

Megachile villipes is a species of bee in the family Megachilidae. It was described by Morawitz in 1875.
