= Megachile louisae =

Scientific classification
- Domain: Eukaryota
- Kingdom: Animalia
- Phylum: Arthropoda
- Class: Insecta
- Order: Hymenoptera
- Family: Megachilidae
- Genus: Megachile
- Species: M. louisae

Binomial name
- Megachile louisae Brauns, 1926

Species of leafcutter bee (Megachile)

Megachile louisae is a species of bee in the family Megachilidae. It was described by Brauns in 1926.
