= Megachile naevia =

Scientific classification
- Domain: Eukaryota
- Kingdom: Animalia
- Phylum: Arthropoda
- Class: Insecta
- Order: Hymenoptera
- Family: Megachilidae
- Genus: Megachile
- Species: M. naevia

Binomial name
- Megachile naevia Kohl, 1906

Species of leafcutter bee (Megachile)

Megachile naevia is a species of bee in the family Megachilidae. It was described by Kohl in 1906.
