= Megachile phaola =

Scientific classification
- Domain: Eukaryota
- Kingdom: Animalia
- Phylum: Arthropoda
- Class: Insecta
- Order: Hymenoptera
- Family: Megachilidae
- Genus: Megachile
- Species: M. phaola

Binomial name
- Megachile phaola Cameron, 1907

Species of leafcutter bee (Megachile)

Megachile phaola is a species of bee in the family Megachilidae. It was described by Cameron in 1907.
