= Megachile squalens =

Scientific classification
- Domain: Eukaryota
- Kingdom: Animalia
- Phylum: Arthropoda
- Class: Insecta
- Order: Hymenoptera
- Family: Megachilidae
- Genus: Megachile
- Species: M. squalens

Binomial name
- Megachile squalens Haliday, 1836

Species of leafcutter bee (Megachile)

Megachile squalens is a species of bee in the family Megachilidae. It was described by Haliday in 1836.
