= Megachile swarbrecki =

Scientific classification
- Kingdom: Animalia
- Phylum: Arthropoda
- Class: Insecta
- Order: Hymenoptera
- Family: Megachilidae
- Genus: Megachile
- Species: M. swarbrecki

Binomial name
- Megachile swarbrecki Rayment, 1946

Species of leafcutter bee (Megachile)

Megachile swarbrecki is a species of bee in the family Megachilidae. It was described by Rayment in 1946.
