= Megachile hirsutula =

Scientific classification
- Domain: Eukaryota
- Kingdom: Animalia
- Phylum: Arthropoda
- Class: Insecta
- Order: Hymenoptera
- Family: Megachilidae
- Genus: Megachile
- Species: M. hirsutula

Binomial name
- Megachile hirsutula Pasteels, 1973

Species of bee

Megachile hirsutula is a species of bee in the family Megachilidae. It was described by Pasteels in 1973.
