= Megachile diasi =

Scientific classification
- Domain: Eukaryota
- Kingdom: Animalia
- Phylum: Arthropoda
- Class: Insecta
- Order: Hymenoptera
- Family: Megachilidae
- Genus: Megachile
- Species: M. diasi

Binomial name
- Megachile diasi Raw, 2006

Species of leafcutter bee (Megachile)

Megachile diasi is a species of bee in the family Megachilidae. It was described by Raw in 2006.
