= Megachile manguna =

Scientific classification
- Domain: Eukaryota
- Kingdom: Animalia
- Phylum: Arthropoda
- Class: Insecta
- Order: Hymenoptera
- Family: Megachilidae
- Genus: Megachile
- Species: M. manguna

Binomial name
- Megachile manguna Strand, 1911

Species of leafcutter bee (Megachile)

Megachile manguna is a species of bee in the family Megachilidae. It was described by Strand in 1911.
