= Megachile opifex =

Scientific classification
- Domain: Eukaryota
- Kingdom: Animalia
- Phylum: Arthropoda
- Class: Insecta
- Order: Hymenoptera
- Family: Megachilidae
- Genus: Megachile
- Species: M. opifex

Binomial name
- Megachile opifex Smith, 1879

Species of leafcutter bee (Megachile)

Megachile opifex is a species of bee in the family Megachilidae. It was described by Smith in 1879.
