= Megachile nigripennis =

Scientific classification
- Kingdom: Animalia
- Phylum: Arthropoda
- Class: Insecta
- Order: Hymenoptera
- Family: Megachilidae
- Genus: Megachile
- Species: M. nigripennis

Binomial name
- Megachile nigripennis Spinola, 1841

Species of leafcutter bee (Megachile)

Megachile nigripennis is a species of bee in the family Megachilidae. It was first described by Spinola in 1841.
