= Megachile duboulaii =

Scientific classification
- Kingdom: Animalia
- Phylum: Arthropoda
- Class: Insecta
- Order: Hymenoptera
- Family: Megachilidae
- Genus: Megachile
- Species: M. duboulaii

Binomial name
- Megachile duboulaii (Smith, 1865)

Species of leafcutter bee (Megachile)

Megachile duboulaii is a species of bee in the family Megachilidae. It was described by Smith in 1865.
