= Megachile infima =

Scientific classification
- Domain: Eukaryota
- Kingdom: Animalia
- Phylum: Arthropoda
- Class: Insecta
- Order: Hymenoptera
- Family: Megachilidae
- Genus: Megachile
- Species: M. infima

Binomial name
- Megachile infima Vachal, 1908

Species of leafcutter bee (Megachile)

Megachile infima is a species of bee in the family Megachilidae. It was described by Vachal in 1908.
