= Megachile armenia =

Scientific classification
- Kingdom: Animalia
- Phylum: Arthropoda
- Class: Insecta
- Order: Hymenoptera
- Family: Megachilidae
- Genus: Megachile
- Species: M. armenia

Binomial name
- Megachile armenia Tkalcu, 1992

Species of leafcutter bee (Megachile)

Megachile armenia is a species of bee in the family Megachilidae. It was described by Tkalcu in 1992.
