= Megachile silvestris =

Scientific classification
- Kingdom: Animalia
- Phylum: Arthropoda
- Class: Insecta
- Order: Hymenoptera
- Family: Megachilidae
- Genus: Megachile
- Species: M. silvestris

Binomial name
- Megachile silvestris Rayment, 1951

Species of leafcutter bee (Megachile)

Megachile silvestris is a species of bee in the family Megachilidae. It was described by Rayment in 1951.
