= Megachile subremotula =

Scientific classification
- Kingdom: Animalia
- Phylum: Arthropoda
- Class: Insecta
- Order: Hymenoptera
- Family: Megachilidae
- Genus: Megachile
- Species: M. subremotula

Binomial name
- Megachile subremotula Rayment, 1934

Species of leafcutter bee (Megachile)

Megachile subremotula is a species of bee in the family Megachilidae. It was described by Rayment in 1934.
