= Megachile diversa =

Scientific classification
- Kingdom: Animalia
- Phylum: Arthropoda
- Class: Insecta
- Order: Hymenoptera
- Family: Megachilidae
- Genus: Megachile
- Species: M. diversa

Binomial name
- Megachile diversa Mitchell, 1930

Species of leafcutter bee (Megachile)

Megachile diversa is a species of bee in the family Megachilidae. It was described by Mitchell in 1930.
