= Megachile kakadui =

Scientific classification
- Kingdom: Animalia
- Phylum: Arthropoda
- Class: Insecta
- Order: Hymenoptera
- Family: Megachilidae
- Genus: Megachile
- Species: M. kakadui

Binomial name
- Megachile kakadui (King, 1994)

Species of leafcutter bee (Megachile)

Megachile kakadui is a species of bee in the family Megachilidae. It was described by King in 1994.
