= Megachile latula =

Scientific classification
- Kingdom: Animalia
- Phylum: Arthropoda
- Class: Insecta
- Order: Hymenoptera
- Family: Megachilidae
- Genus: Megachile
- Species: M. latula

Binomial name
- Megachile latula Vachal, 1908

Species of leafcutter bee (Megachile)

Megachile latula is a species of bee belonging to the family Megachilidae. It was described by Vachal in 1908.
