= Megachile modesta =

Scientific classification
- Kingdom: Animalia
- Phylum: Arthropoda
- Class: Insecta
- Order: Hymenoptera
- Family: Megachilidae
- Genus: Megachile
- Species: M. modesta

Binomial name
- Megachile modesta Smith, 1862

Species of leafcutter bee (Megachile)

Megachile modesta is a species of bee in the family Megachilidae. It was described by Smith in 1862.
