= List of bees of Israel =

Israel is home to about 1100 described species of bees. A partial list is given below, with around 850 species as of 2014. Bee taxonomy and nomenclature are in accordance with the Discover Life website.

== Indigenous species ==
=== Colletidae ===
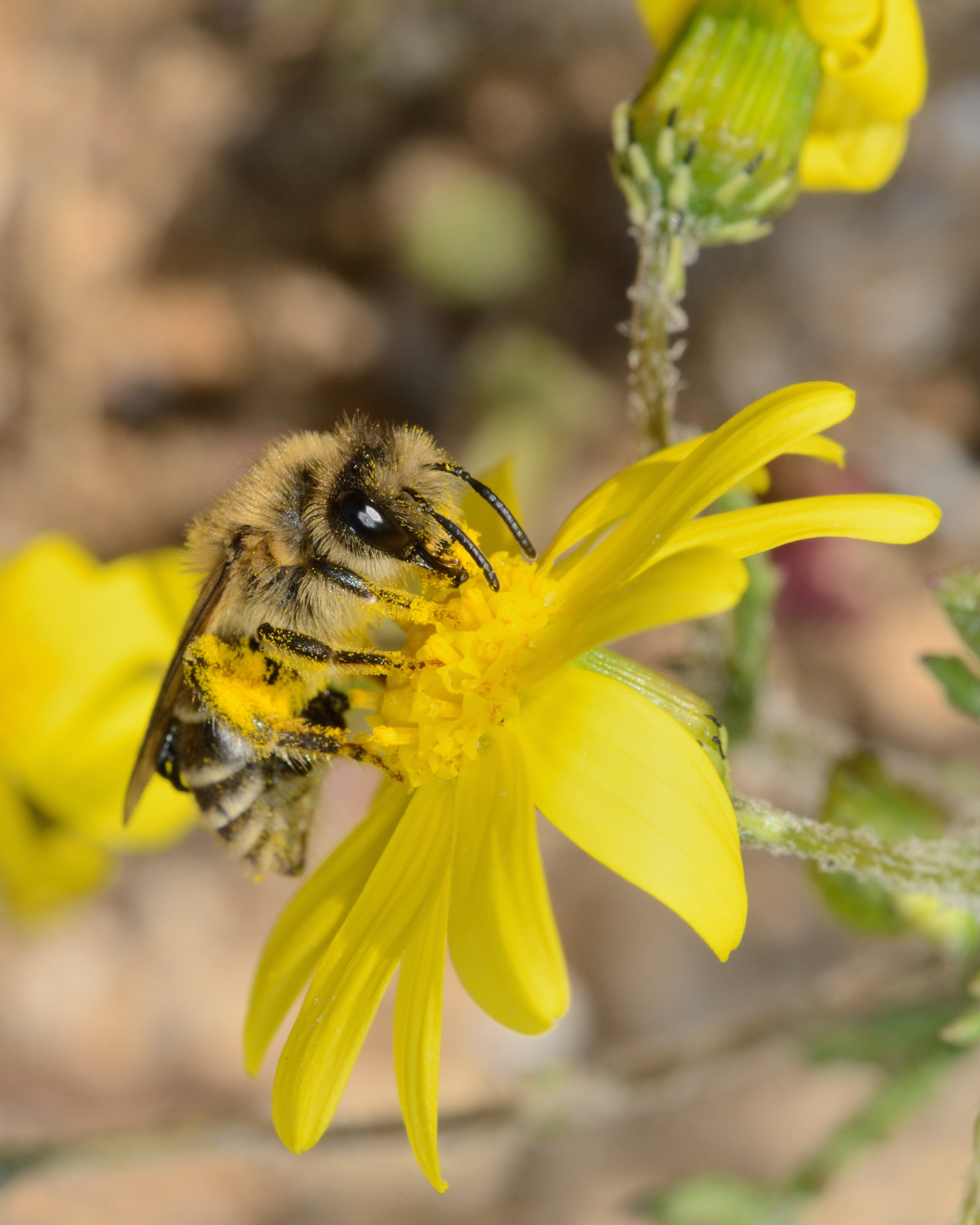
1. Colletes cariniger, female
  Colletes acutiformis Noskiewicz, 1936
2. Colletes albomaculatus (Lucas, 1849)
3. Colletes alfkeni Noskiewicz, 1958
4. Colletes bytinskii Noskiewicz, 1955 קולט ביטינסקי
5. Colletes cariniger Pérez, 1903
6. Colletes elegans Noskiewicz, 1936
7. Colletes formosus Pérez, 1895
8. Colletes fuscicornis Noskiewicz, 1936
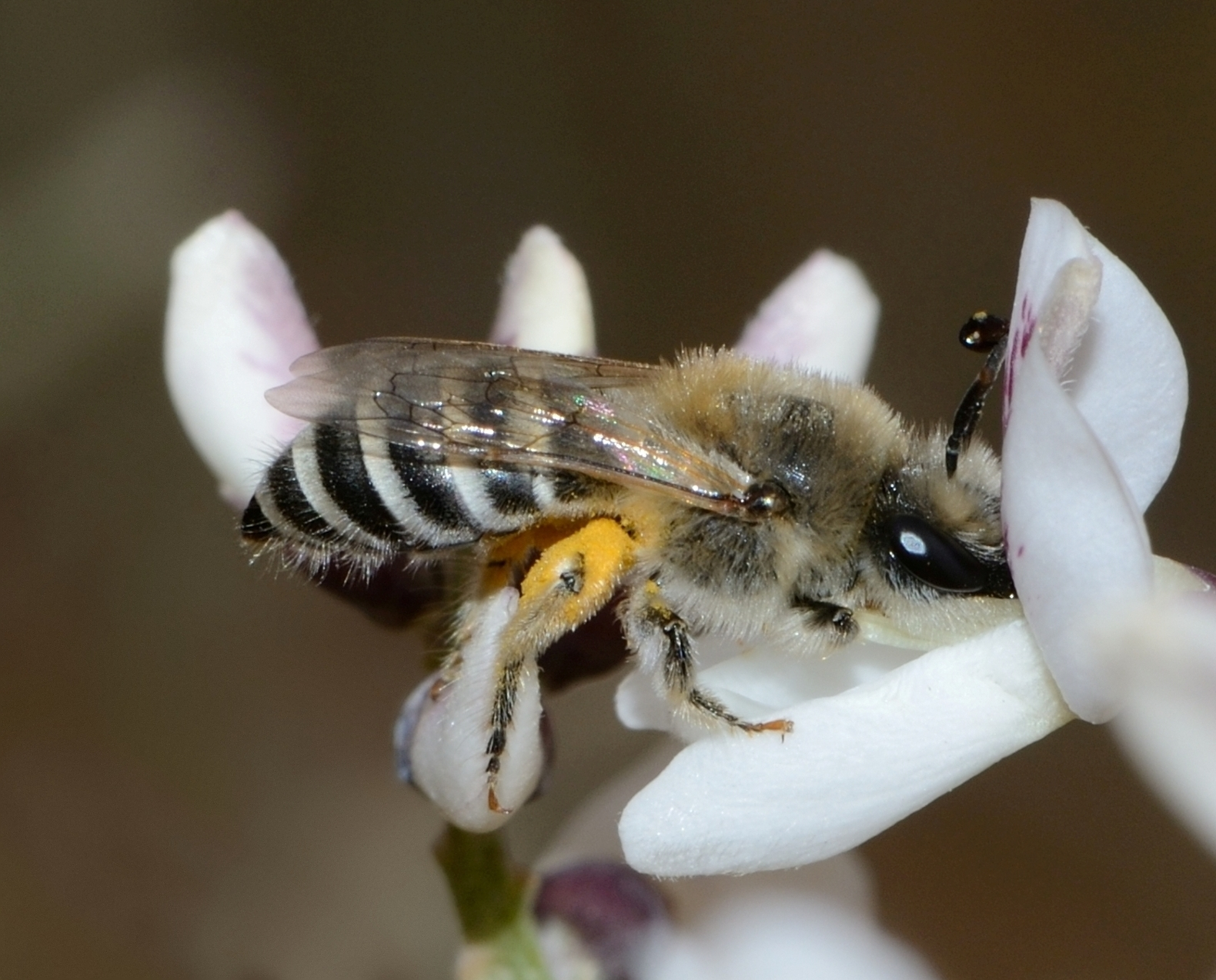
9. Colletes judaicus, female
  Colletes judaicus Noskiewicz, 1955 קולט יהודה
10. Colletes lacunatus Dours, 1872
11. Colletes maidli Dours, 1872
12. Colletes nanus Friese, 1898
13. Colletes perezi Morice, 1904
14. Colletes pseudojejunus Noskiewicz, 1959
15. Colletes pumilus Morice, 1904
16. Colletes punctatus Mocsáry, 1877
17. Colletes rozeni Kuhlmann, 2005
18. Colletes similis Schenck, 1853
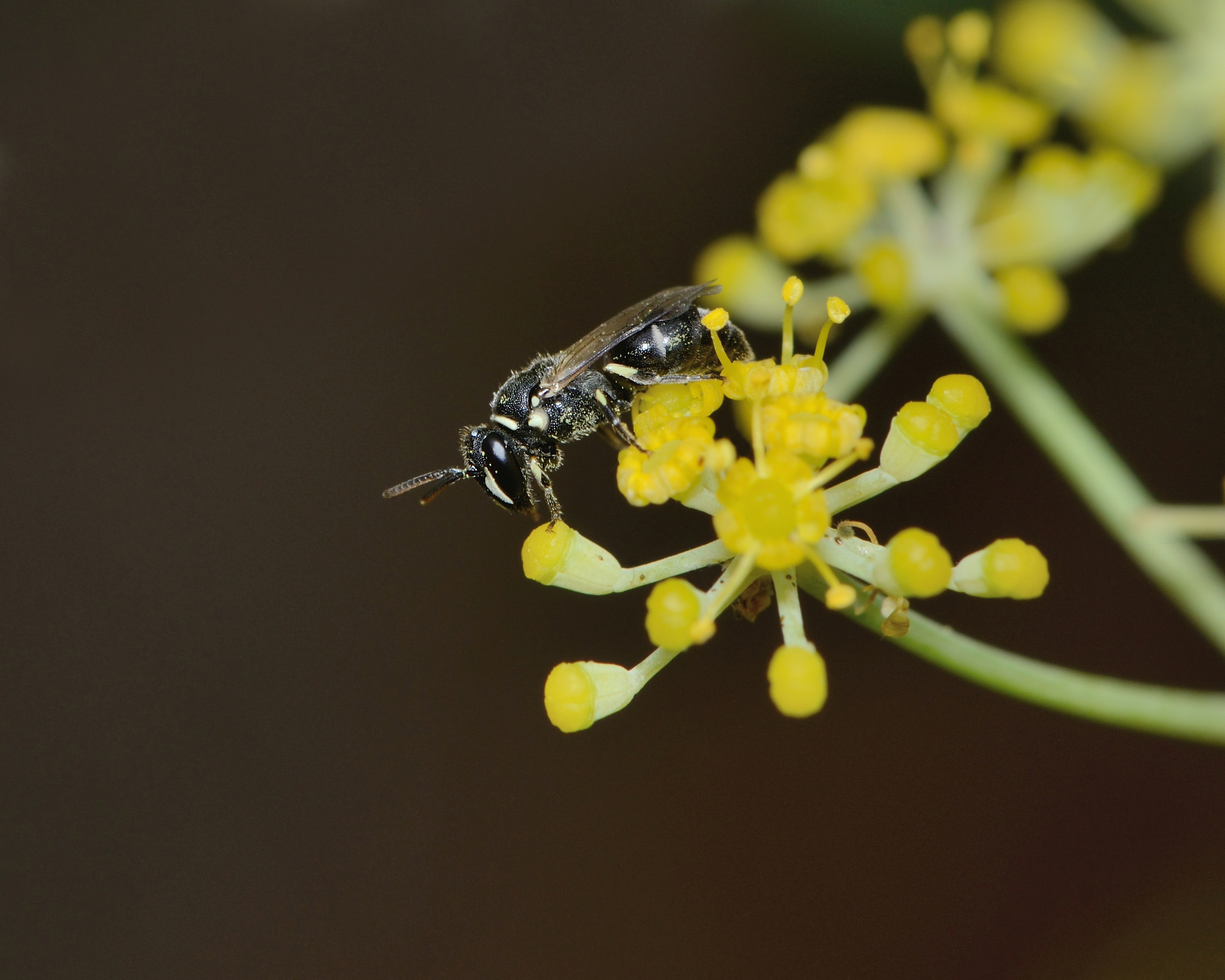
19. Hylaeus adspersus, female
  Colletes squamulosus Noskiewicz, 1936 קולט קשקשי
20. Colletes tuberculatus Morawitz, 1894
21. Hylaeus adspersus (Alfken, 1935)
22. Hylaeus albonotatus (Walker, 1871)
23. Hylaeus alexandrinus (Warncke, 1992)
24. Hylaeus armeniacus (Warncke, 1981)
25. Hylaeus bifasciatus (Jurine, 1807)
26. Hylaeus brevicornis Nylander, 1852 מסוונית קצרת-מחוש
27. Hylaeus clypearis (Schenck, 1853)
28. Hylaeus cornutus Curtis, 1831
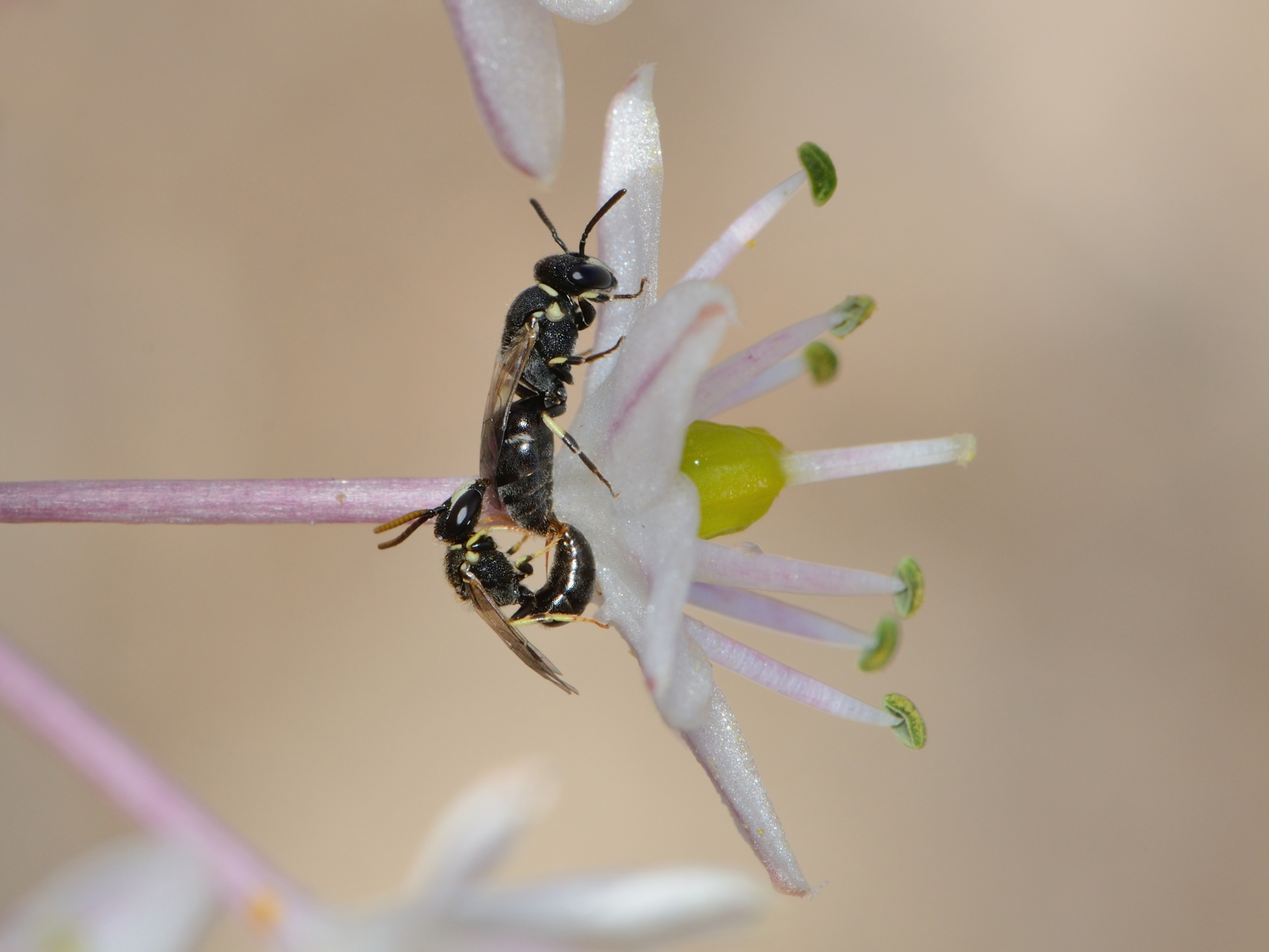
29. Hylaeus longimaculus, copulation
  Hylaeus crispulus Dathe, 1980
30. Hylaeus dinkleri (Friese, 1898)
31. Hylaeus fossifer Dathe, 1995
32. Hylaeus gibbus Saunders, 1850
33. Hylaeus gujaraticus (Nurse, 1903)
34. Hylaeus hermonus (Warncke, 1981)
35. Hylaeus imparilis Forster, 1871
36. Hylaeus kahri Forster, 1871
37. Hylaeus kotschisus (Warncke, 1981)
38. Hylaeus laevithorax (Alfken, 1924)
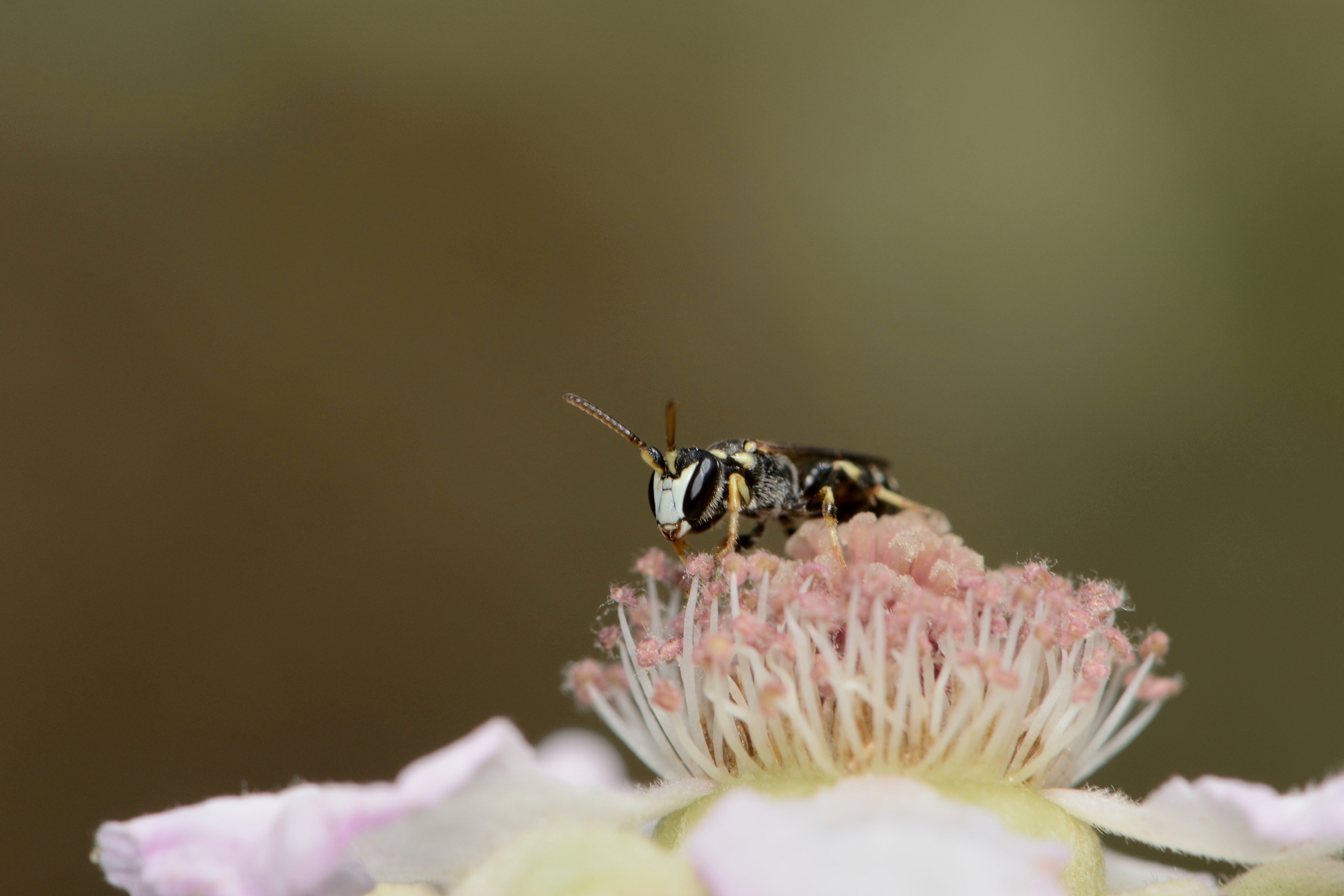
39. Hylaeus rubicola, male
  Hylaeus lineolatus (Schenck, 1861)
40. Hylaeus longimaculus (Alfken, 1936)
41. Hylaeus maculatus (Alfken, 1904)
42. Hylaeus moricei (Friese, 1898)
43. Hylaeus nigrifacies Bramson, 1879 מסוונית האגמון
44. Hylaeus orientalicus (Warncke, 1981)
45. Hylaeus pictipes Nylander, 1852
46. Hylaeus pictus (Smith, 1853)
47. Hylaeus punctatus (Brulle, 1832)
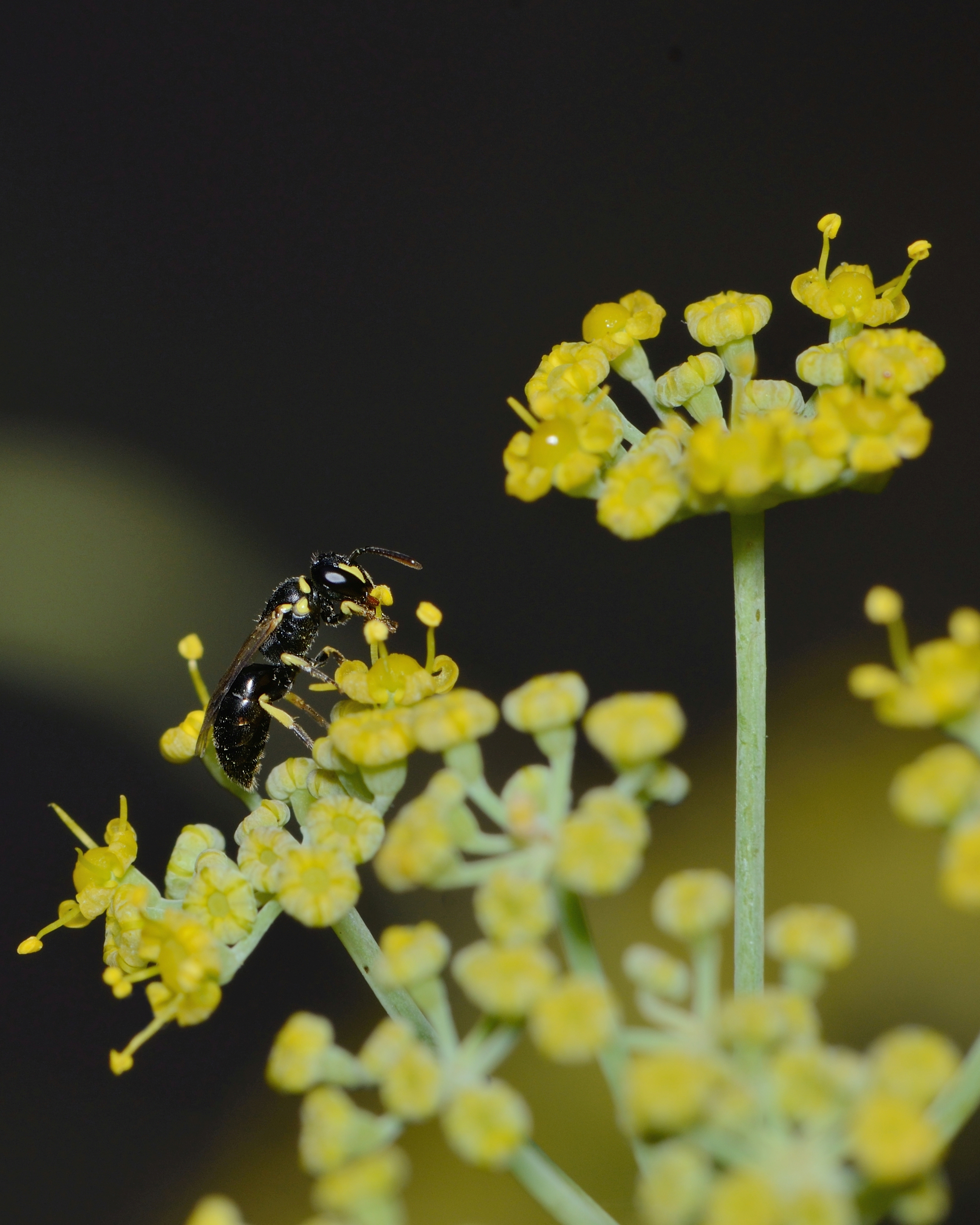
48. Hylaeus taeniolatus, female
  Hylaeus punctulatissimus Smith, 1842
49. Hylaeus punctus Förster, 1871
50. Hylaeus rubicola Saunders, 1850
51. Hylaeus rugicollis Morawitz, 1873
52. Hylaeus scutellatus (Spinola, 1838)
53. Hylaeus sidensis (Warncke, 1981)
54. Hylaeus signatus (Panzer, 1798)
55. Hylaeus sinuatus (Schenck, 1853)
56. Hylaeus soror (Pérez, 1903)
57. Hylaeus syriacus (Alfken, 1936)
58. Hylaeus taeniolatus Forster, 1871
59. Hylaeus trifidus (Alfken, 1936)
60. Hylaeus tyrolensis Forster, 1871
61. Hylaeus variegatus (Fabricius, 1798)
62. Hylaeus xanthopoda (Vachal, 1895) מסוונית צהובת-רגל

=== Andrenidae ===
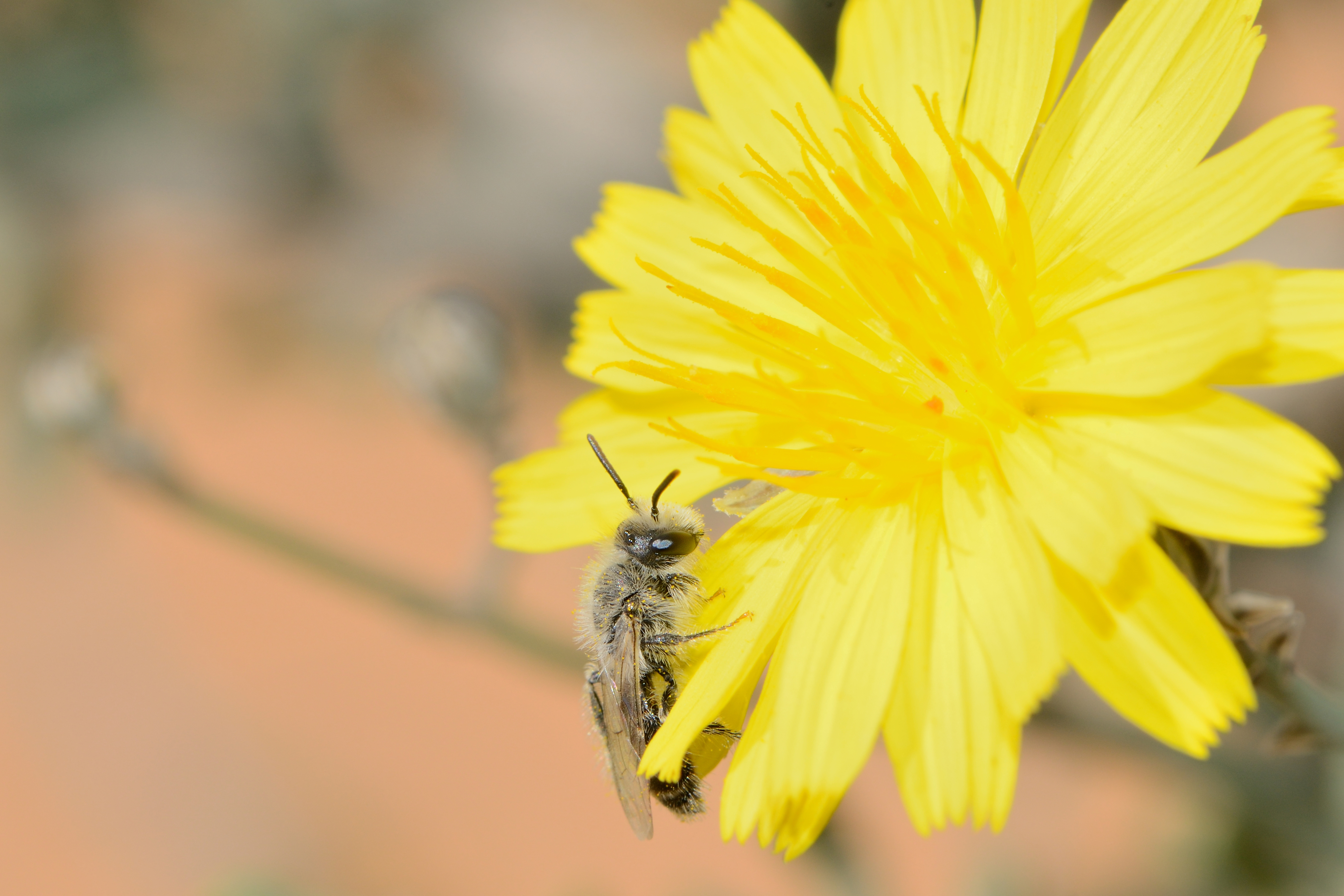
1. Andrena cf. aegyptiaca, male
  Andrena abbreviata Dours, 1873
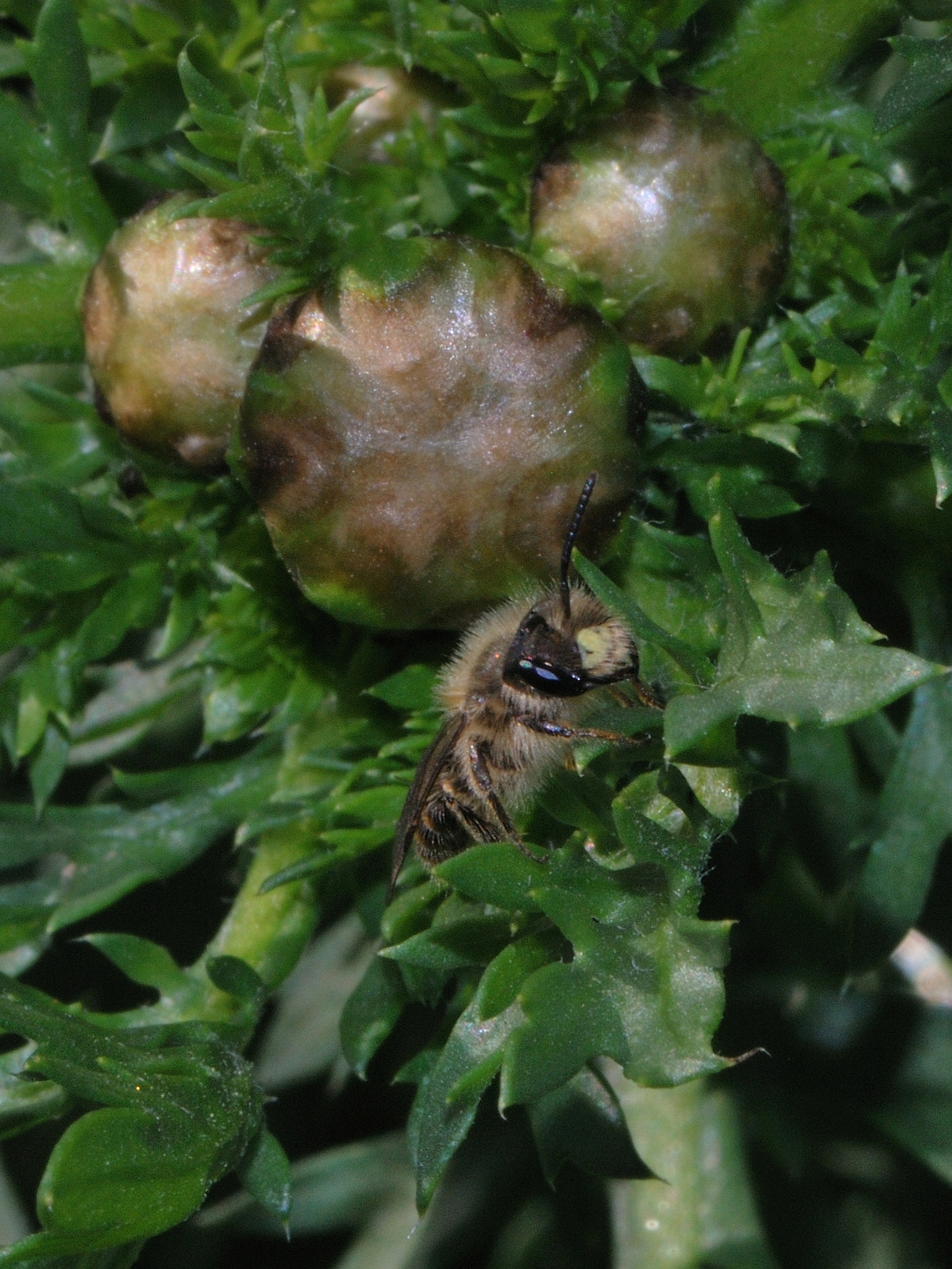
2. Andrena aerinifrons, male
  Andrena aegyptiaca Friese, 1899
3. Andrena aegypticola Friese, 1922
4. Andrena aeneiventris Morawitz, 1872
5. Andrena aerinifrons Dours, 1873
6. Andrena albifacies Alfken, 1927
7. Andrena albopunctata (Rossi, 1792)
8. Andrena alfkenelloides Warncke, 1965
9. Andrena anatolica Alfken, 1935
10. Andrena arsinoe Schmiedeknecht, 1900
11. Andrena aruana Warncke, 1967
12. Andrena astica Warncke, 1967
13. Andrena avara Warncke, 1967
14. Andrena bassana Warncke, 1969
15. Andrena bimaculata (Kirby, 1802)
16. Andrena biskrensis Pérez, 1895
17. Andrena bisulcata Morawitz, 1877
18. Andrena bonasia Warncke, 1969
19. Andrena brumanensis Friese, 1899
20. Andrena butea Warncke, 1965
21. Andrena bytinskii Warncke, 1969
22. Andrena caroli Pérez, 1895
23. Andrena caspica Morawitz, 1886
24. Andrena chaetogastra Pittioni, 1950
25. Andrena cinereophila Warncke, 1965
26. Andrena colletiformis Morawitz, 1874
27. Andrena combaella Warncke, 1966
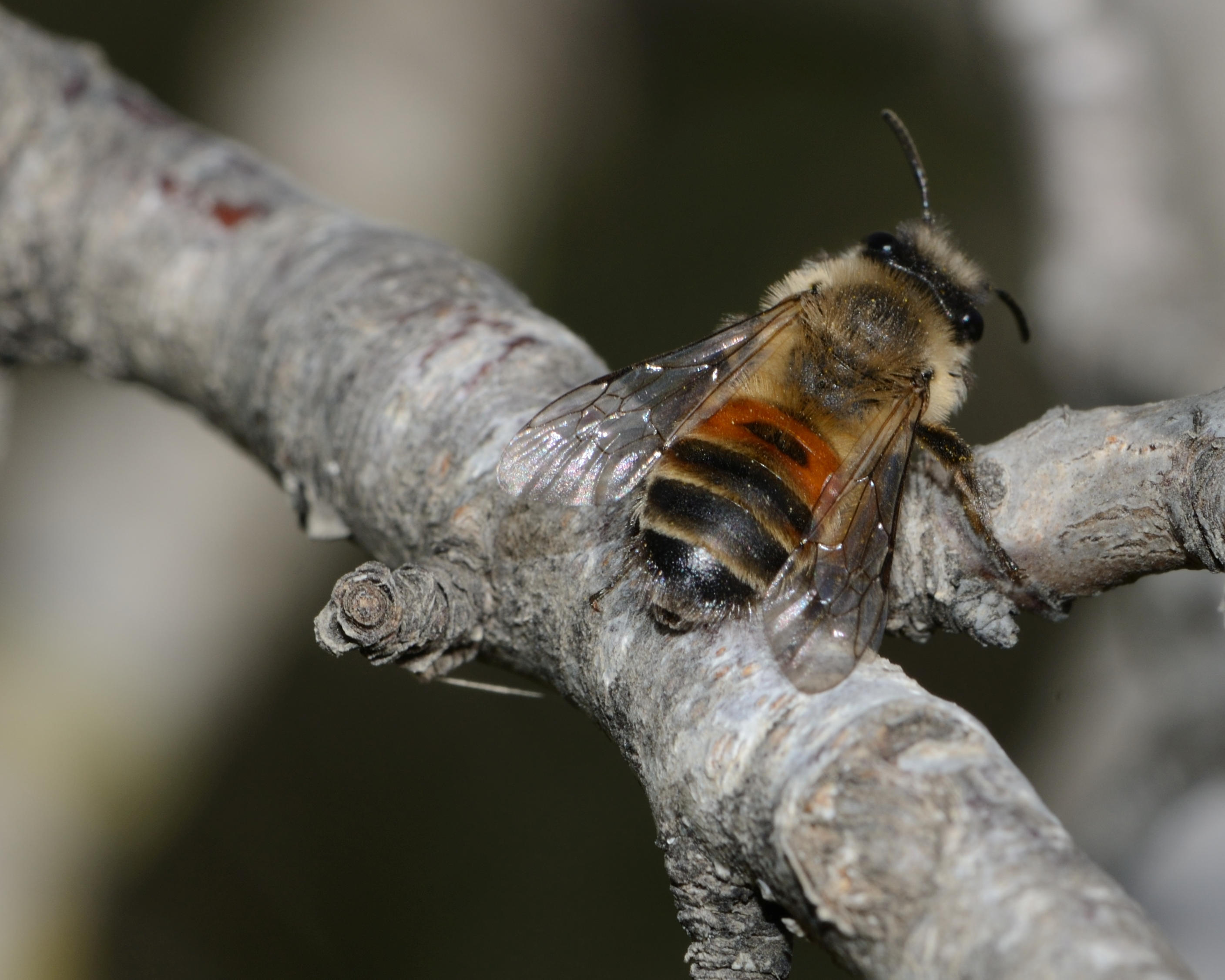
28. Andrena elmaria, female
  Andrena combusta Morawitz, 1876
29. Andrena crassana Warncke, 1965
30. Andrena crocusella Pisanty & Scheuchl 2016
31. Andrena cubiceps Friese, 1914
32. Andrena curiosa (Morawitz, 1877)
33. Andrena cyanomicans Pérez, 1895
34. Andrena cypria Pittioni, 1950
35. Andrena danini Pisanty & Scheuchl 2016
36. Andrena dauma Warncke, 1969
37. Andrena dorsata (Kirby, 1802)
38. Andrena elisaria Gusenleitner, 1998
39. Andrena elmaria Gusenleitner, 1998
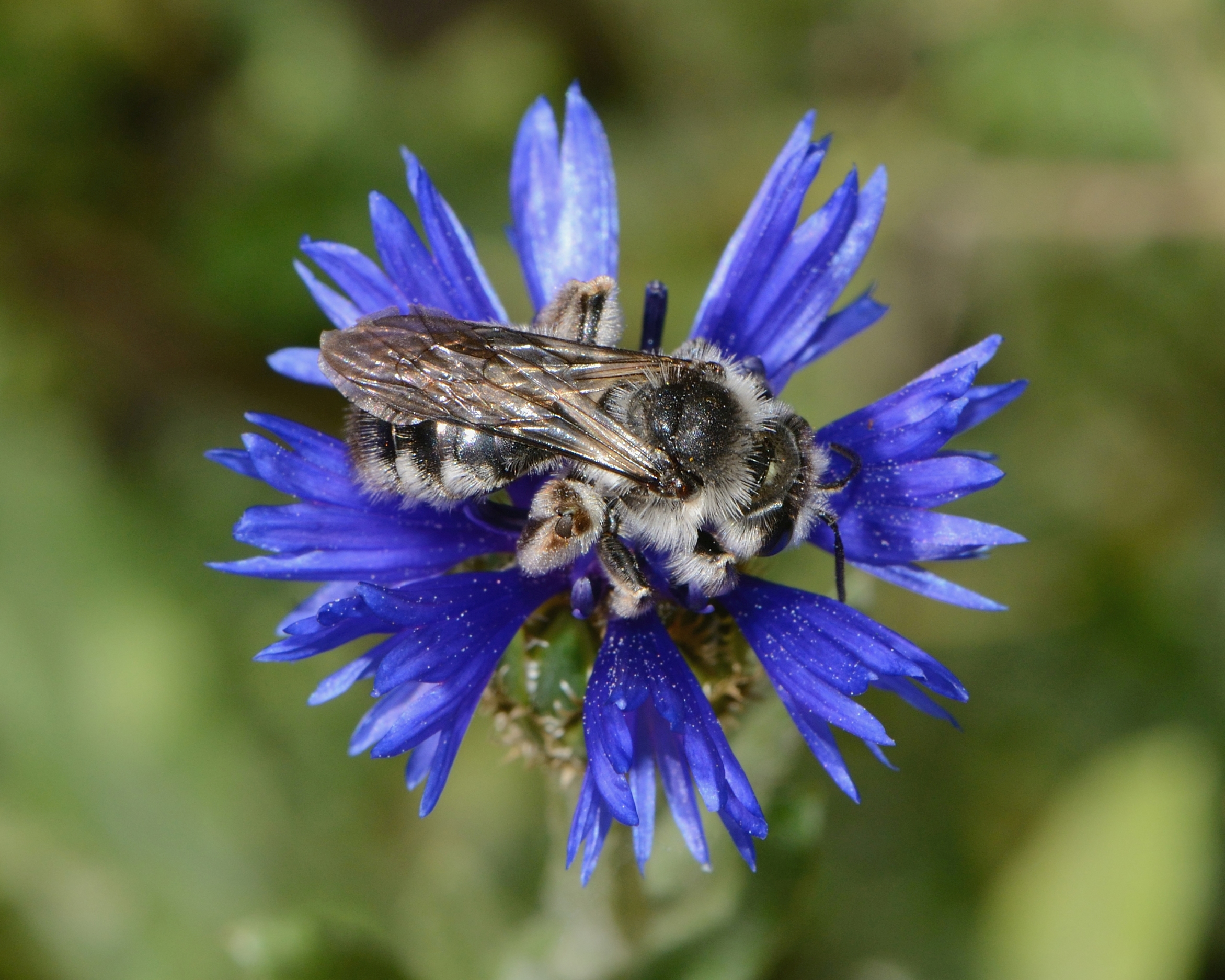
40. Andrena fuscocalcarata, female
  Andrena eremobia Guiglia, 1833
41. Andrena euzona Pérez, 1895
42. Andrena exquisita Warncke, 1975
43. Andrena falcinella Warncke, 1969
44. Andrena fimbriatoides Scheuchl, 2004
45. Andrena flavipes Panzer, 1799 אנדרנה צהובת-רגל
46. Andrena forsterella Osytshnjuk, 1978
47. Andrena freidbergi Pisanty & Scheuchl, 2018
48. Andrena fuligula Warncke, 1965
49. Andrena fulvitarsis Brulle, 1832
50. Andrena fuscocalcarata Morawitz, 1877
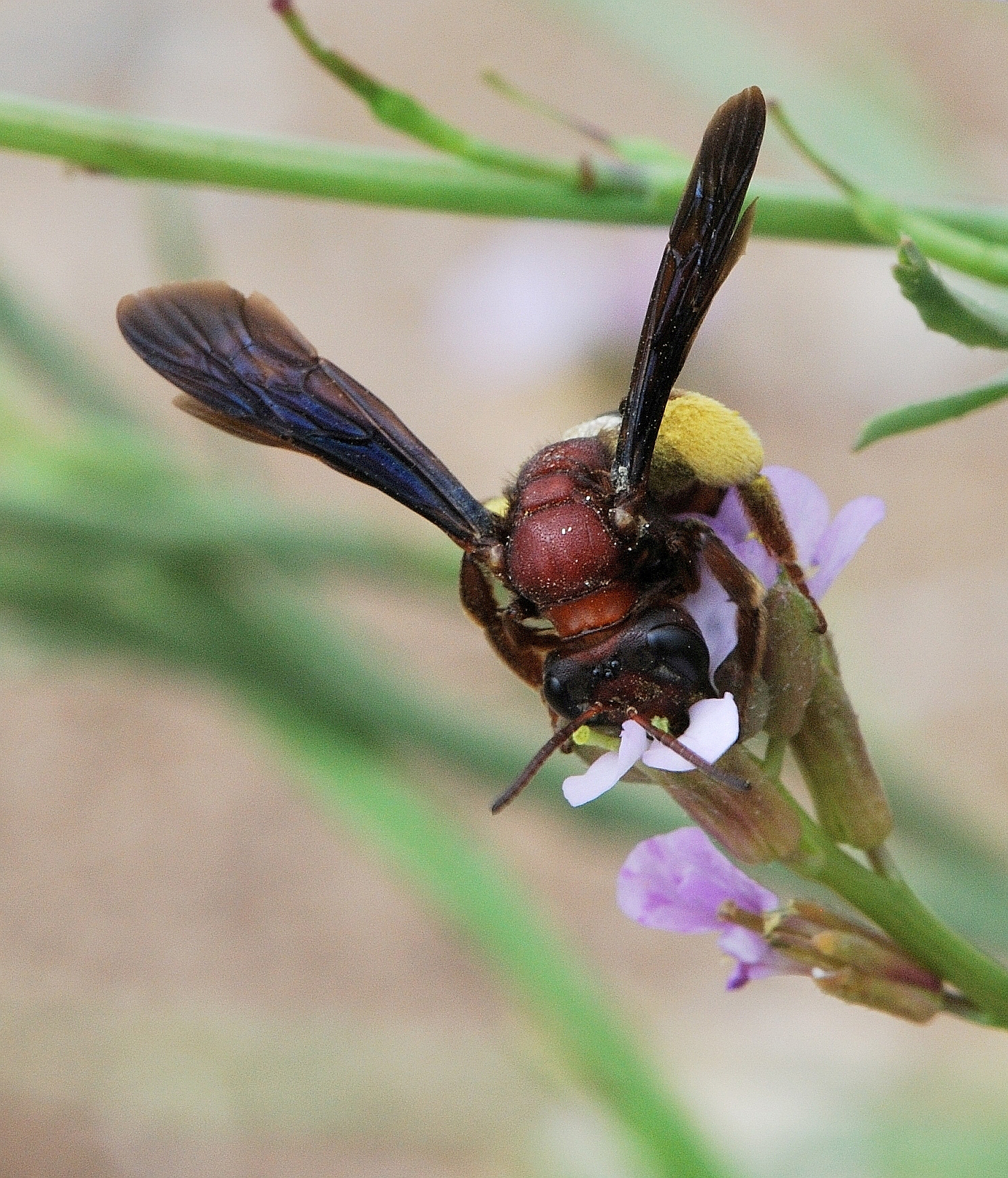
51. Andrena fuscosa, female
  Andrena fuscosa Erichson, 1835
52. Andrena galilaea Pisanty & Scheuchl, 2018
53. Andrena garrula Warncke, 1965
54. Andrena gazella Friese, 1922
55. Andrena glareola Warncke, 1969
56. Andrena gordia Warncke, 1975
57. Andrena govinda Warncke, 1974
58. Andrena guttata Warncke, 1969
59. Andrena helouanensis Friese, 1899
60. Andrena henotica Warncke, 1975
61. Andrena hermonella Scheuchl & Pisanty 2016
62. Andrena hesperia Smith, 1853
63. Andrena hierosolymitana Pisanty & Scheuchl, 2018
64. Andrena humabilis Warncke, 1965
65. Andrena hyacinthina Mavromoustakis, 1958
66. Andrena hyemala Warncke, 1973
67. Andrena iliaca Warncke, 1969
68. Andrena impasta Warncke, 1975
69. Andrena impunctata Pérez, 1895
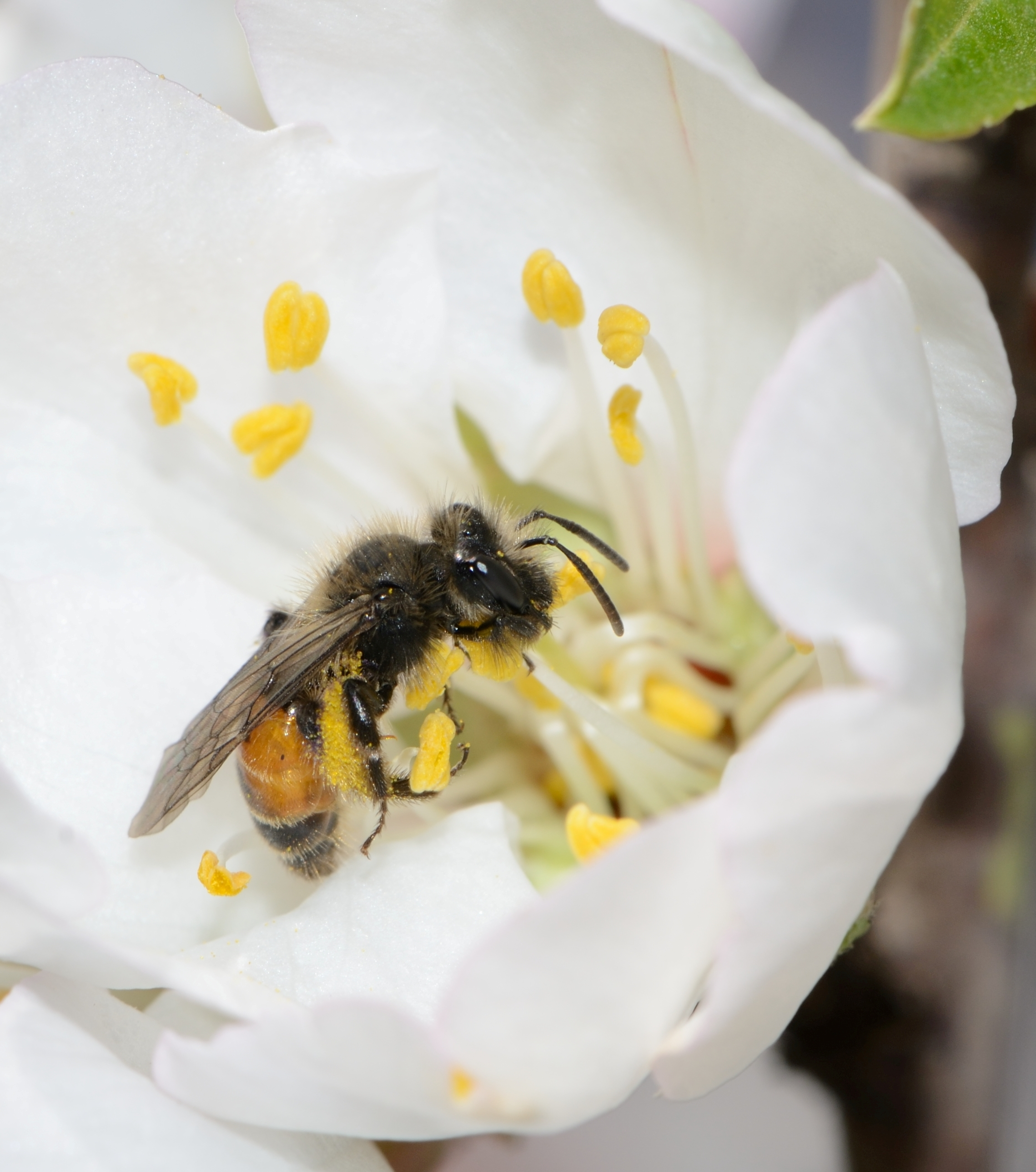
70. Andrena krausiella, female
  Andrena innesi Gribodo, 1894
71. Andrena isabellina Warncke, 1969
72. Andrena isis Schmiedeknecht, 1900
73. Andrena israelica Scheuchl & Pisanty 2016
74. Andrena judaea Scheuchl & Pisanty 2016
75. Andrena kilikiae Warncke, 1969
76. Andrena krausiella Gusenleitner, 1998
77. Andrena labialis (Kirby, 1802)
78. Andrena langadensis Warncke, 1965
79. Andrena lateralis Morawitz, 1876
80. Andrena lepida Schenck, 1861
81. Andrena leucura Warncke, 1974
82. Andrena limata Smith, 1853
83. Andrena lindbergella Pittioni, 1950
84. Andrena longibarbis Pérez, 1895
85. Andrena luscinia Warncke, 1975
86. Andrena magunta Warncke, 1965
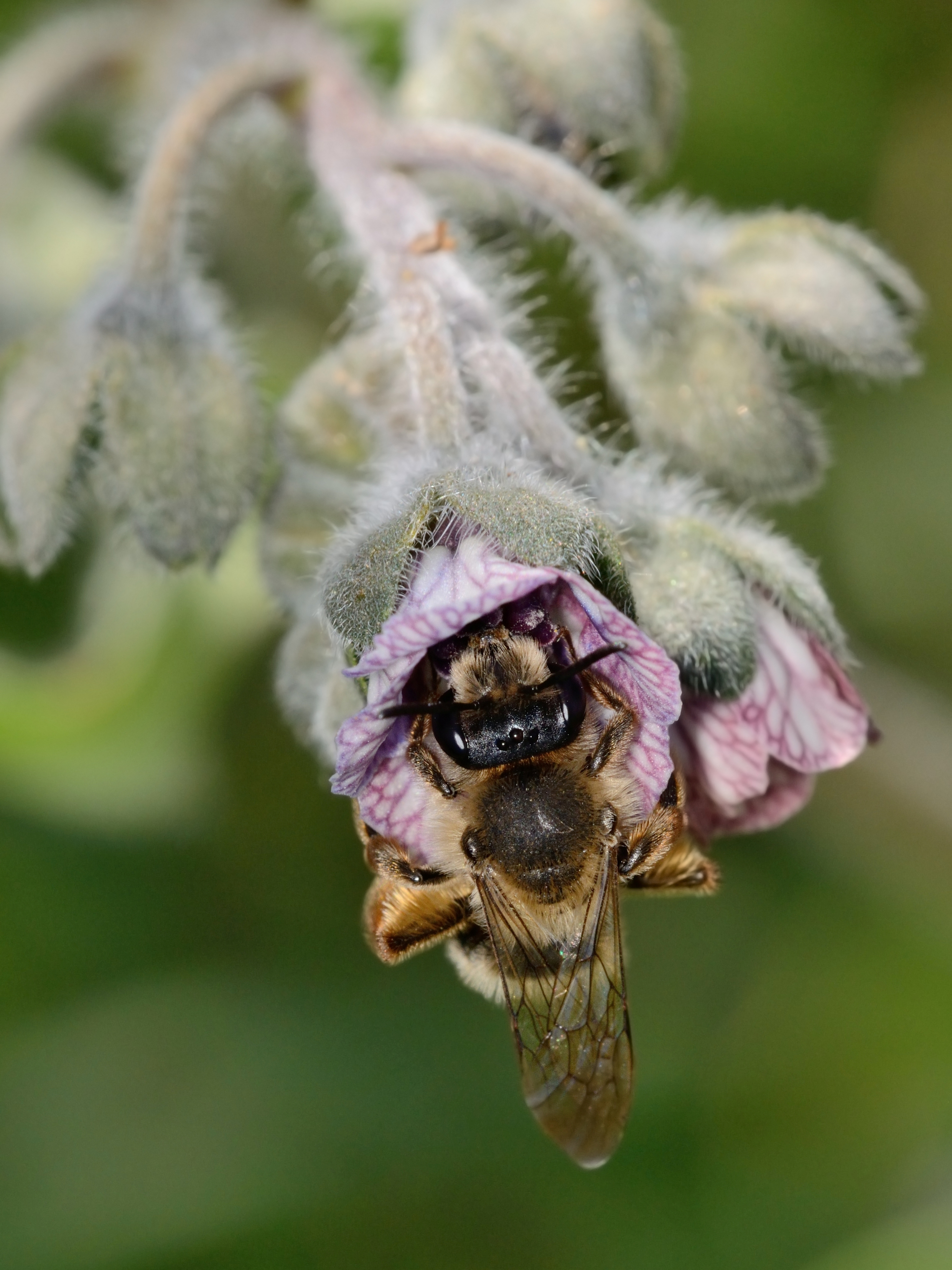
87. Andrena rotundilabris, female
  Andrena mariana Warncke, 1968
88. Andrena mehelyi Alfken, 1936
89. Andrena melittoides Friese, 1899
90. Andrena menahemella Scheuchl & Pisanty 2016
91. Andrena merula Warncke, 1969
92. Andrena microcardia Pérez, 1895
93. Andrena monilia Warncke, 1967
94. Andrena moricei Friese, 1899
95. Andrena morio Brulle, 1832 אנדרנה שחורה
96. Andrena mucida Kriechbaumer 1873
97. Andrena mucronata Morawitz, 1871
98. Andrena negevana Gusenleitner & Scheuchl, 2000
99. Andrena nigroaenea (Kirby, 1802)
100. Andrena nisoria Warncke, 1969
101. Andrena nitidiuscula Schenck, 1853
102. Andrena nubica Warncke, 1975
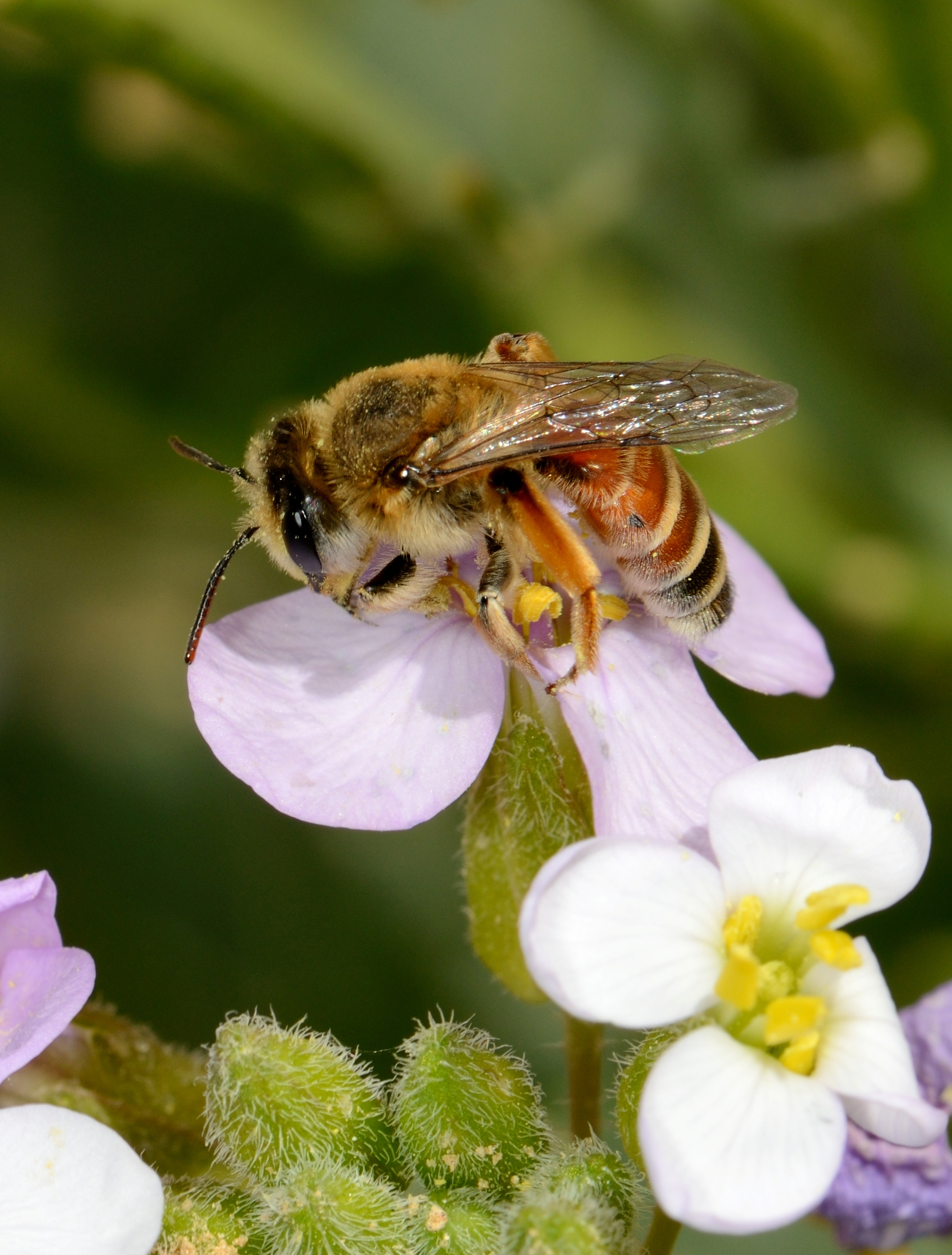
103. Andrena savignyi, female
  Andrena oedicnema Warncke, 1975
104. Andrena orientana Warncke, 1965
105. Andrena ovatula (Kirby, 1802)
106. Andrena paganettina Warncke, 1965
107. Andrena palaestina Pisanty & Scheuchl 2016
108. Andrena pallidicincta Brulle, 1832
109. Andrena pandosa Warncke, 1968
110. Andrena panurgimorpha Mavromoustakis, 1957
111. Andrena paradoxa Friese, 1921
112. Andrena paramythensis Mavromoustakis, 1957
113. Andrena paucisquama Noskiewicz, 1924
114. Andrena perahia Pisanty & Scheuchl 2016
115. Andrena pesleria Gusenleitner, 1998
116. Andrena pinkeunia Warncke, 1969
117. Andrena pyropygia Kriechbaumer, 1873
118. Andrena pyrozonata Friese, 1921
119. Andrena ramlehiana Pérez, 1903
120. Andrena rotundilabris Morawitz, 1877
121. Andrena rufitibialis Friese, 1899
122. Andrena rufomaculata Friese, 1921
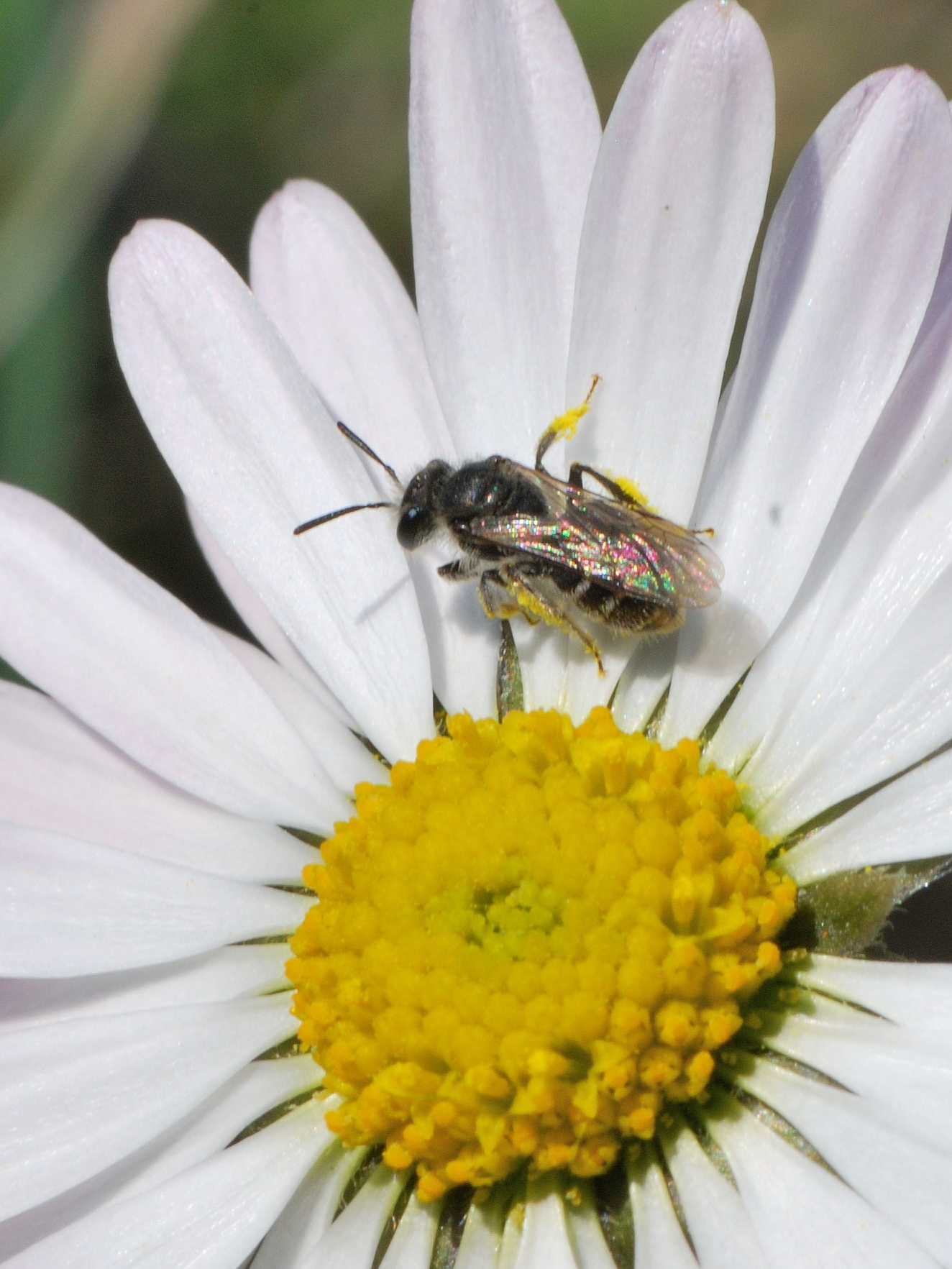
123. Andrena (Micrandrena) sp., female
  Andrena rugothorace Warncke, 1965
124. Andrena rusticola Warncke, 1975
125. Andrena saettana Warncke, 1975
126. Andrena savignyi Spinola, 1838
127. Andrena schencki Morawitz, 1866
128. Andrena sedumella Scheuchl & Pisanty, 2018
129. Andrena selena Gusenleitner, 1994
130. Andrena semirubra Morawitz, 1876
131. Andrena serraticornis Warncke, 1965
132. Andrena sigiella Gusenleitner, 1998
133. Andrena similis Smith, 1849
134. Andrena simontornyella Noskiewicz, 1939
135. Andrena speciosa Friese, 1899
136. Andrena sphecodimorpha Hedicke, 1942
137. Andrena spolata Warncke, 1968
138. Andrena spreta Pérez, 1895
139. Andrena statusa Gusenleitner, 1998
140. Andrena stenofovea Scheuchl & Pisanty, 2018
141. Andrena tadauchii Gusenleitner, 1998
142. Andrena tadorna Warncke, 1974
143. Andrena thoracica (Fabricius, 1775)
144. Andrena tiaretta Warncke, 1974
145. Andrena tkalcui Gusenleitner & Schwarz, 2002
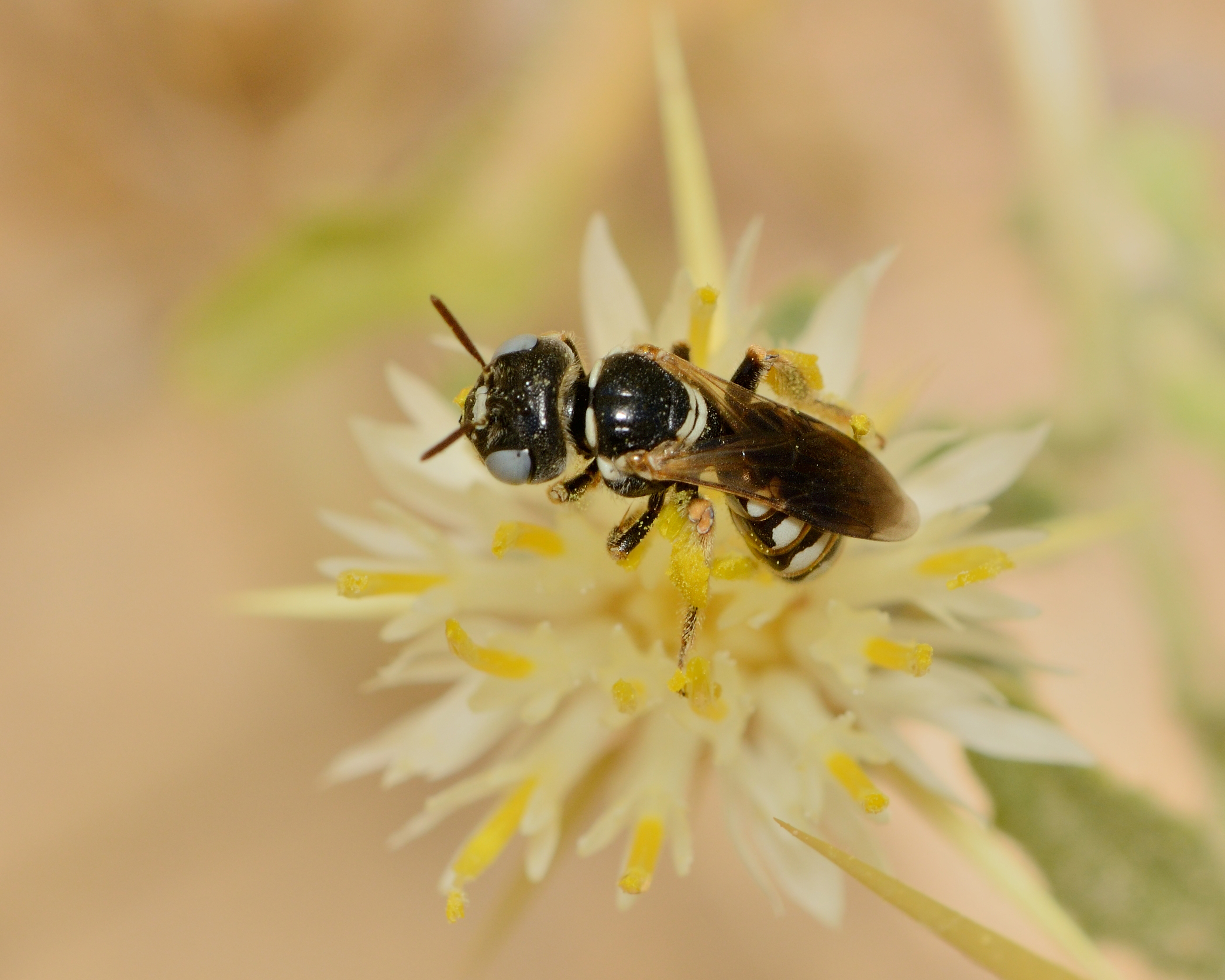
146. Camptopoeum (Camptopoeum) sp., female
  Andrena toelgiana Friese, 1921
147. Andrena torda Warncke, 1965
148. Andrena transitoria Morawitz, 1871 אנדרנה דבורית
149. Andrena trimmerana (Kirby, 1802)
150. Andrena tringa Warncke, 1973
151. Andrena troodica Warncke, 1975
152. Andrena truncatilabris Morawitz, 1877
153. Andrena tscheki Morawitz, 1872
154. Andrena ulula Warncke, 1969
155. Andrena ungeri Mavromoustakis, 1952
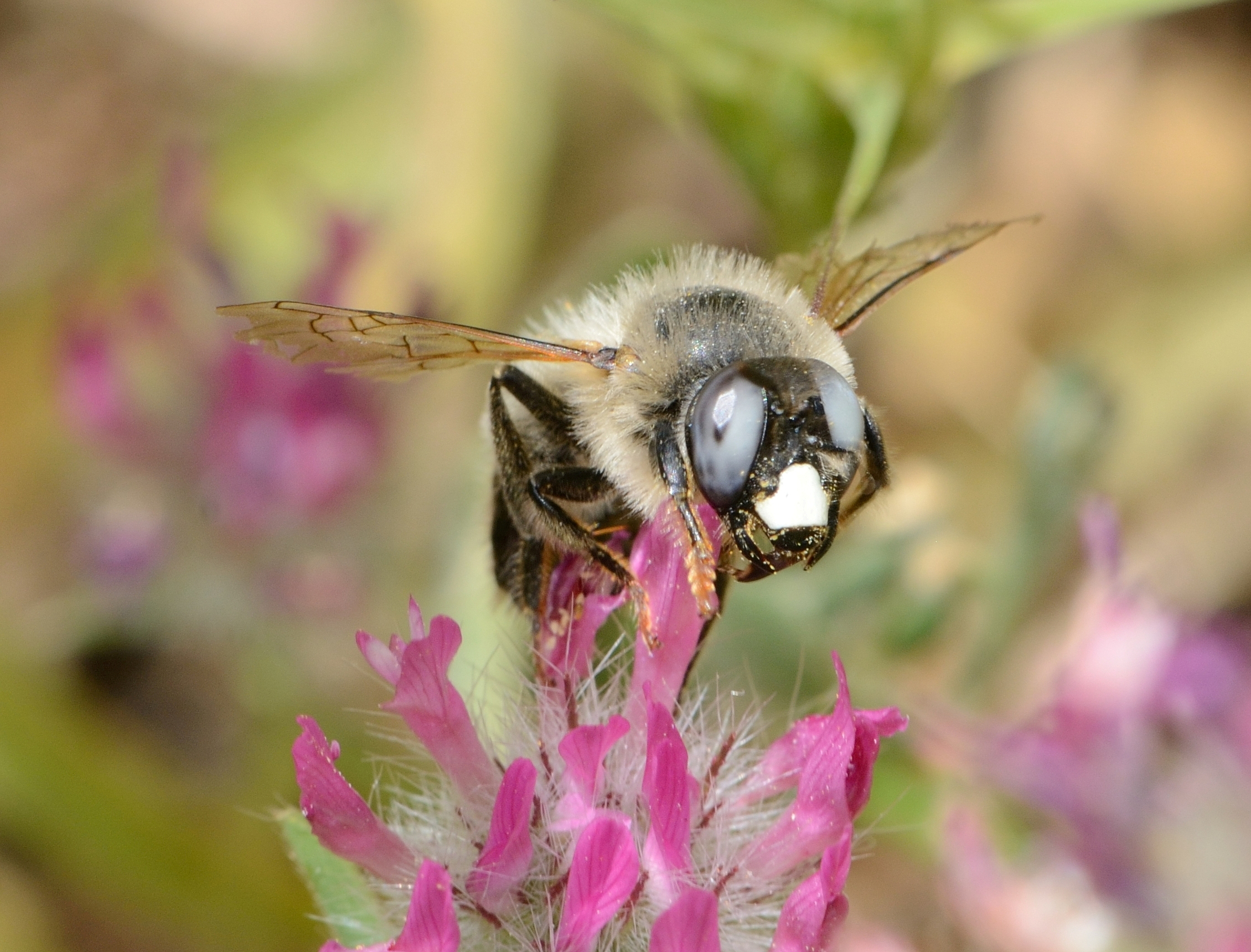
156. Melitturga syriaca, male
  Andrena unicincta Friese, 1899
157. Andrena urfanella Scheuchl & Hazir, 2012
158. Andrena vachali Pérez, 1895
159. Andrena variabilis Smith, 1853
160. Andrena varicornis Pérez, 1895
161. Andrena venerabilis Alfken, 1935
162. Andrena ventricosa Dours, 1873
163. Andrena vetula Lepeletier, 1841
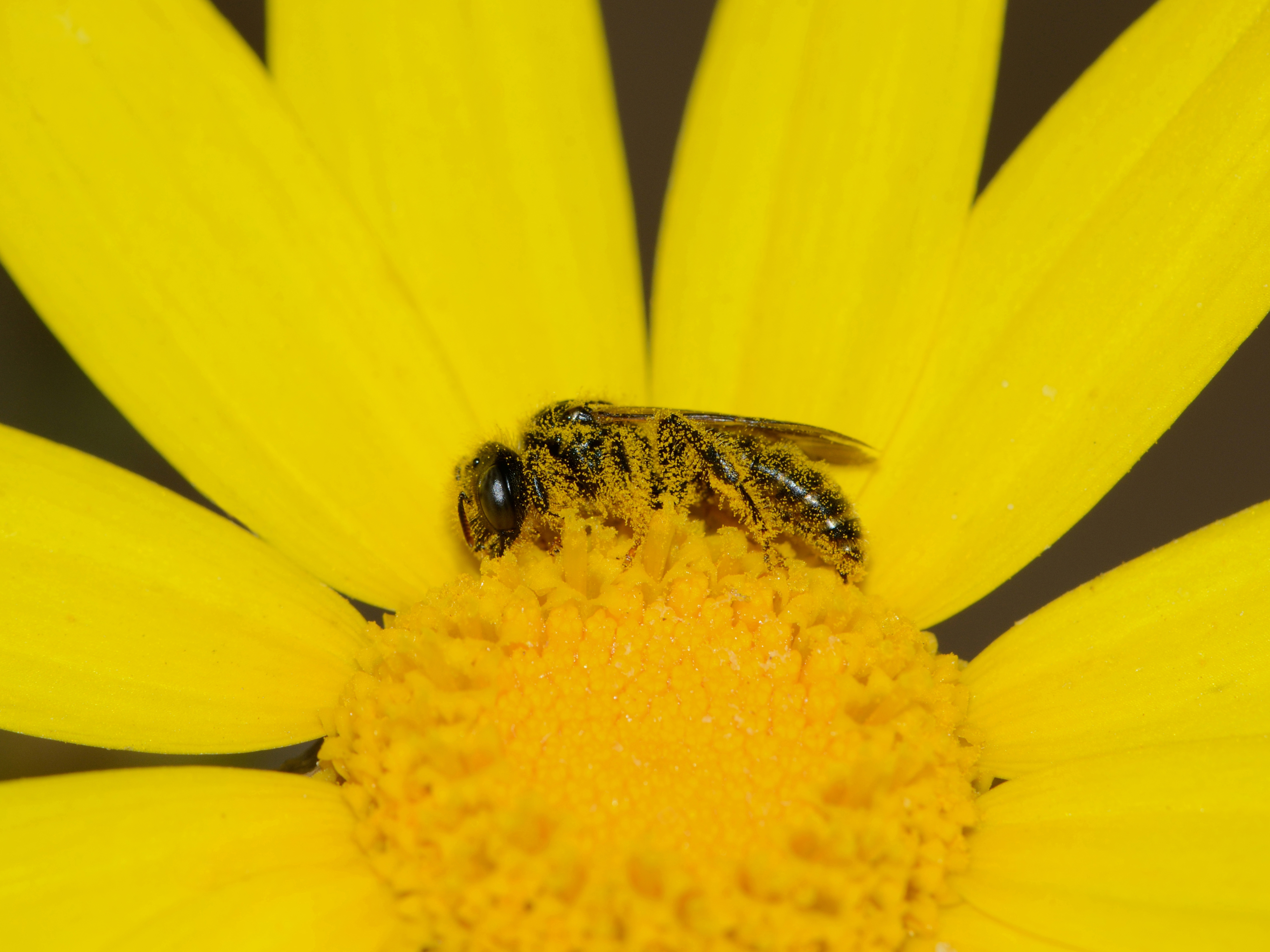
164. Panurgus pyropygus, male
  Andrena volka Warncke, 1969
165. Andrena wilhelmi Schuberth, 1995
166. Andrena wolfi Gusenleitner & Scheuchl, 2000
167. Andrena yelkouan Warncke, 1975
168. Camptopoeum abbasi (Warncke, 1985)
169. Camptopoeum negevense (Warncke, 1972)
170. Camptopoeum nigrotum (Warncke, 1987)
171. Camptopoeum rubrum (Warncke, 1987)
172. Camptopoeum sacrum Alfken, 1935
173. Camptopoeum variegatum (Morawitz, 1876)
174. Clavipanurgus impressus (Warncke, 1972)
175. Clavipanurgus orientalicus (Warncke, 1972)
176. Clavipanurgus punctiventris (Morawitz, 1876)
177. Melitturga krausi Schwarz, 2003
178. Melitturga pictipes Morawitz, 1892
179. Melitturga spinosa Morawitz, 1892
180. Melitturga syriaca Friese, 1899
181. Panurginus turcomanicus Popov, 1936
182. Panurgus buteus Warncke, 1972
183. Panurgus dentatus Friese, 1901
184. Panurgus nigriscopus Pérez, 1895
185. Panurgus oblitus Warncke, 1972
186. Panurgus platymerus Pérez, 1895
187. Panurgus posticus Warncke, 1972
188. Panurgus pyropygus Friese, 1901

=== Halictidae ===
1. Ceylalictus punjabensis (Cameron, 1907)
2. Ceylalictus seistanicus (Blüthgen, 1934)
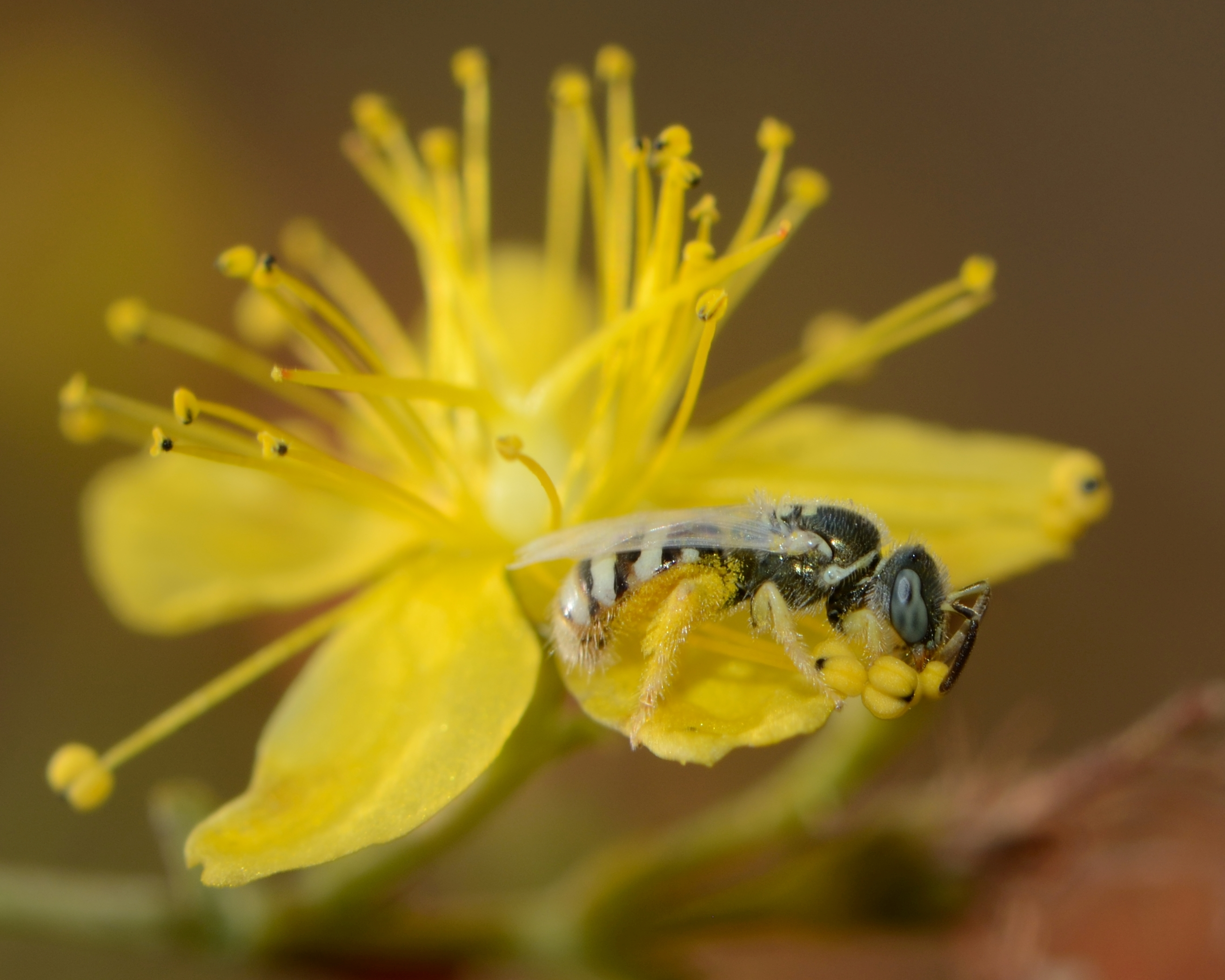
3. Ceylalictus variegatus, female
  Ceylalictus variegatus (Olivier, 1789)
4. Dufourea bytinskii Ebmer, 1999
5. Dufourea chagrina (Warncke, 1979)
6. Dufourea goeleti Ebmer, 1999
7. Dufourea longicornis (Warncke, 1979)
8. Dufourea nodicornis (Warncke, 1979)
9. Dufourea rufiventris Friese, 1898
10. Dufourea similis Friese, 1898
11. Dufourea trigonellae Ebmer, 1999
12. Halictus aegypticola Strand, 1909
13. Halictus alfkenellus Strand, 1909
14. Halictus asperulus Pérez, 1895
15. Halictus berlandi Blüthgen, 1936
16. Halictus brunnescens (Eversmann, 1852)
17. Halictus cephalicus Morawitz, 1873
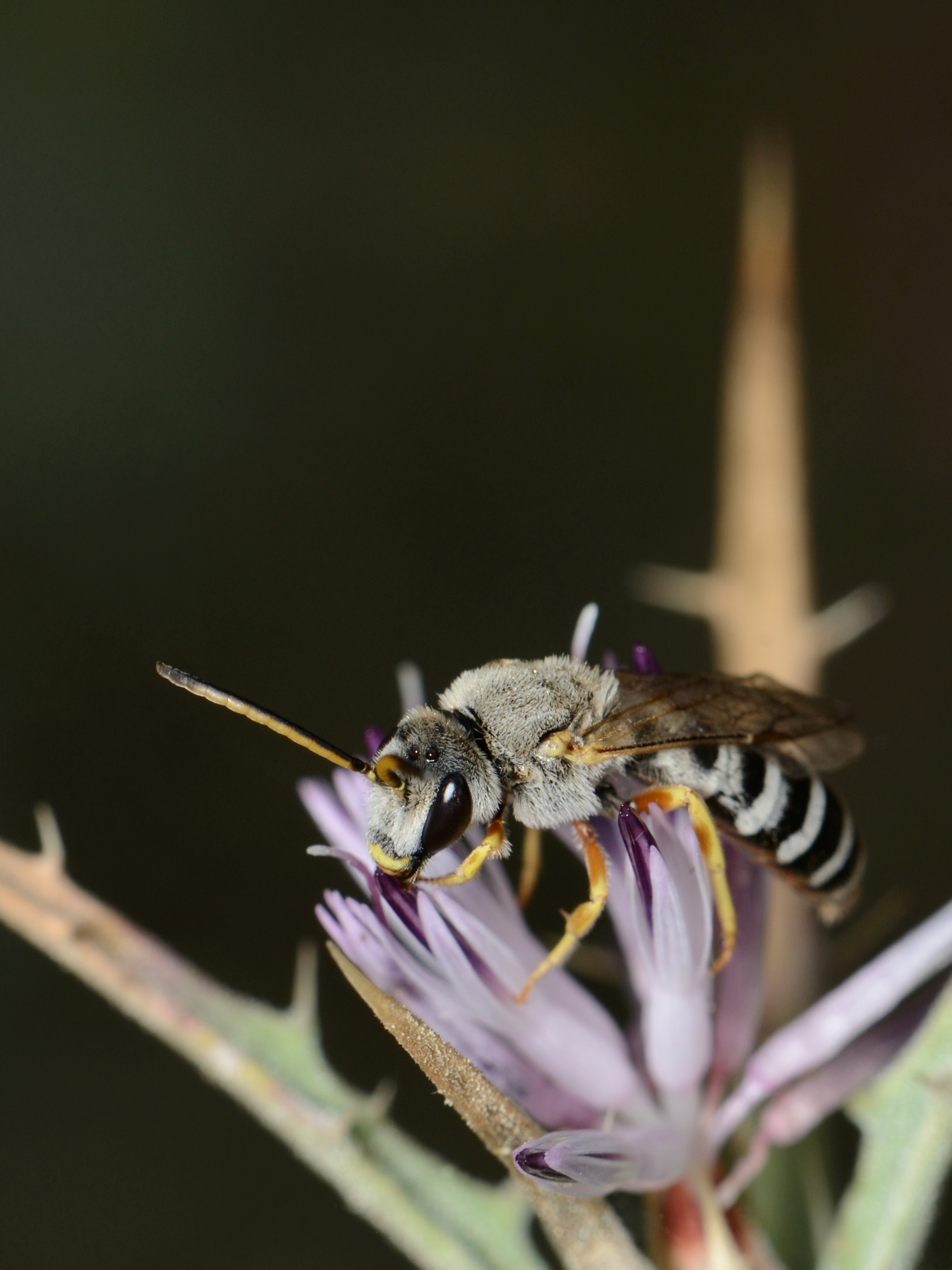
18. Halictus resurgens, male
  Halictus cupidus Vachal, 1902
19. Halictus cypricus (Blüthgen, 1937)
20. Halictus fatsensis Blüthgen, 1936
21. Halictus hermon Ebmer, 1975
22. Halictus libanensis Pérez, 1911
23. Halictus lucidipennis Smith, 1853
24. Halictus maculatus Smith, 1848 הליקטית עקודה
25. Halictus patellatus Morawitz, 1874
26. Halictus pici Pérez, 1895
27. Halictus pollinosus (Sichel, 1860)
28. Halictus quadricinctus (Fabricius, 1776) הליקטית ארבע-פסית
29. Halictus resurgens Nurse, 1903 הליקטית מזרחית
30. Halictus semiticus (Blüthgen, 1955)
31. Halictus senilis (Eversmann, 1852)
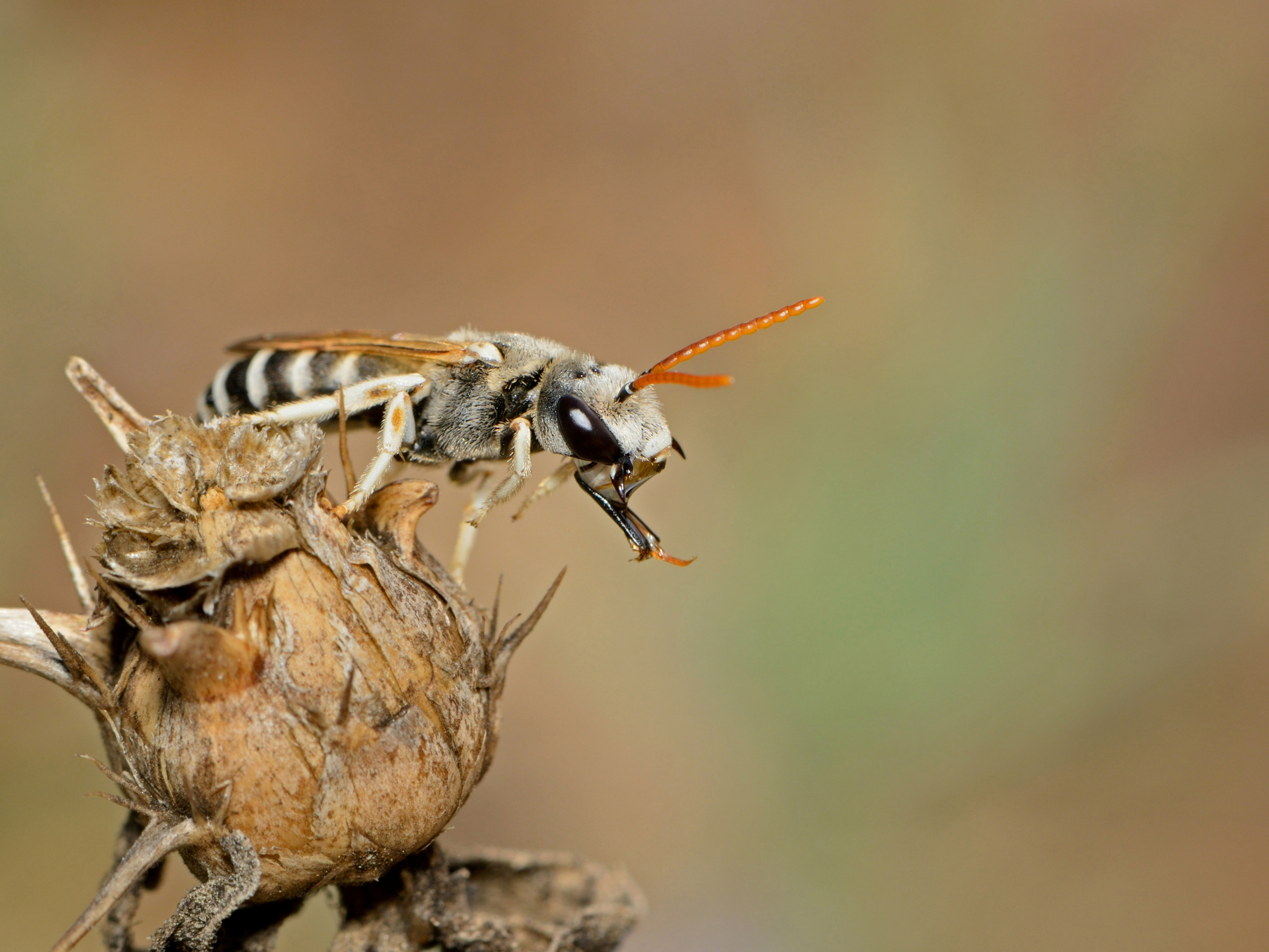
32. Halictus tetrazonianellus, male
  Halictus sexcinctus Fabricius, 1775
33. Halictus smaragdulus Vachal, 1895
34. Halictus subauratus (Rossi, 1792)
35. Halictus subsenilis Blüthgen, 1955
36. Halictus tetrazonianellus Strand, 1909
37. Halictus tetrazonius Klug in Germar, 1817
38. Halictus tibialis Walker, 1871
39. Halictus tuberculatus (Blüthgen, 1924)
40. Lasioglossum adaliae (Blüthgen, 1923)
41. Lasioglossum aegyptiellum (Strand, 1909)
42. Lasioglossum aglyphum (Pérez, 1895)
43. Lasioglossum alanum (Blüthgen, 1929)
44. Lasioglossum anellum (Vachal, 1905)
45. Lasioglossum angustipes Ebmer, 1972
46. Lasioglossum articulare (Pérez, 1895)
47. Lasioglossum bicallosum (Morawitz, 1874)
48. Lasioglossum bischoffi (Blüthgen, 1931)
49. Lasioglossum callizonium (Pérez, 1896)
50. Lasioglossum carneiventre (Dours, 1872)
51. Lasioglossum caspicum (Morawitz, 1874)
52. Lasioglossum clypeiferellum (Strand, 1909)
53. Lasioglossum costulatum (Kriechbaumer, 1873)
54. Lasioglossum crassepunctatum (Blüthgen, 1923)
55. Lasioglossum cristula (Pérez, 1896)
56. Lasioglossum damascenum (Pérez, 1910)
57. Lasioglossum debilior (Pérez, 1910)
58. Lasioglossum dichrous (Blüthgen, 1924)
59. Lasioglossum discum (Smith, 1853)
60. Lasioglossum dolichocephalum (Blüthgen, 1923)
61. Lasioglossum elbanum (Blüthgen, 1934)
62. Lasioglossum enslini Bytinski-Salz & Ebmer, 1974
63. Lasioglossum epipygiale (Blüthgen, 1924)
64. Lasioglossum fasciger (Strand, 1909)
65. Lasioglossum filipes Ebmer, 1972
66. Lasioglossum gibber (Vachal, 1892)
67. Lasioglossum glabriusculum (Morawitz, 1872)
68. Lasioglossum griseolum (Morawitz, 1872)
69. Lasioglossum hethiticum Ebmer, 1970
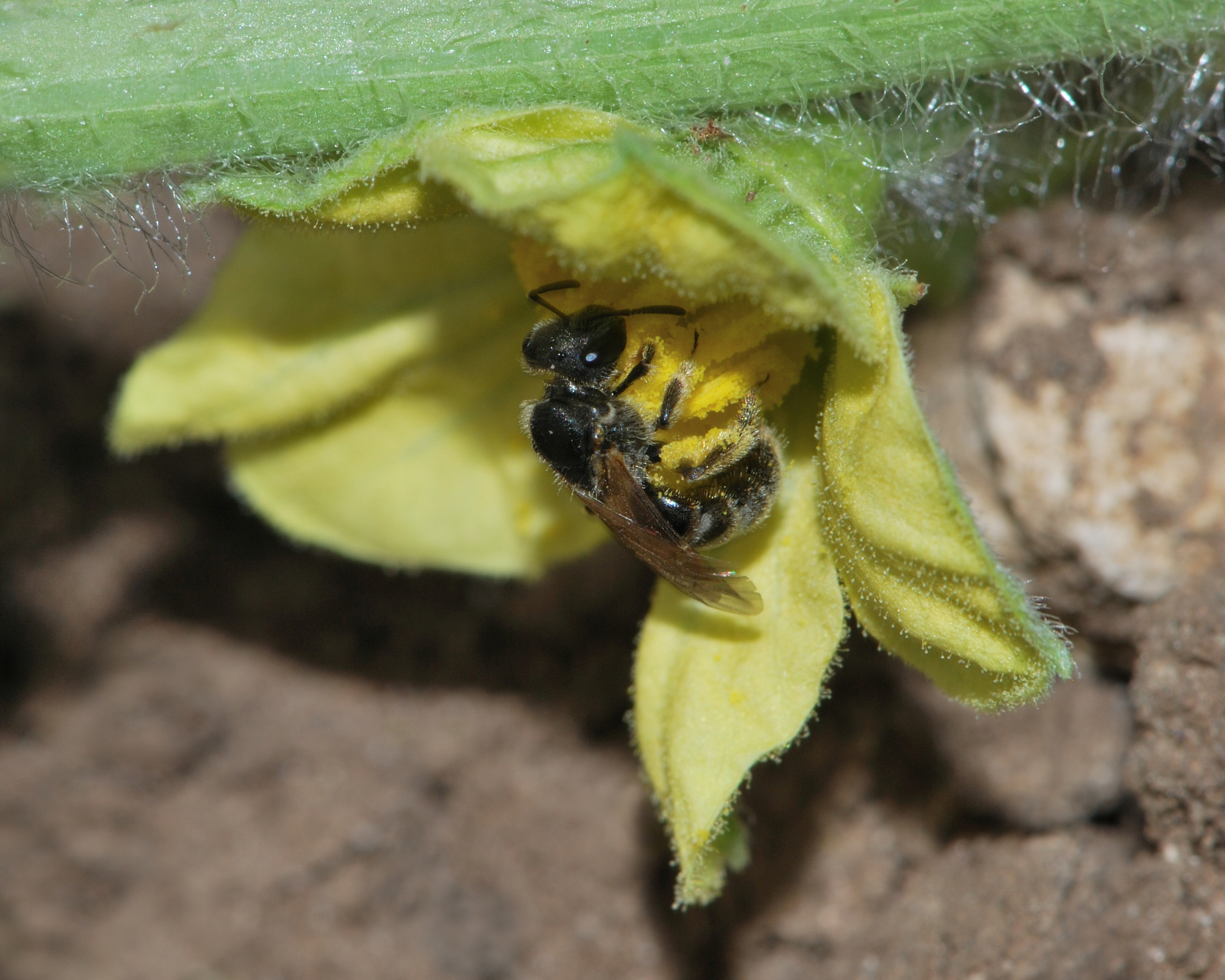
70. Lasioglossum malachurum, female
  Lasioglossum imbecillum Ebmer, 1974
71. Lasioglossum israelense Ebmer, 1974
72. Lasioglossum ituraeum Ebmer, 1972
73. Lasioglossum laeve (Kirby, 1802)
74. Lasioglossum laevidorsum (Blüthgen, 1923)
75. Lasioglossum laticeps (Schenck, 1870)
76. Lasioglossum leptocephalum (Blüthgen, 1923)
77. Lasioglossum leucopymatum (Dalla Torre, 1896)
78. Lasioglossum leucozonium (Schrank, 1781)
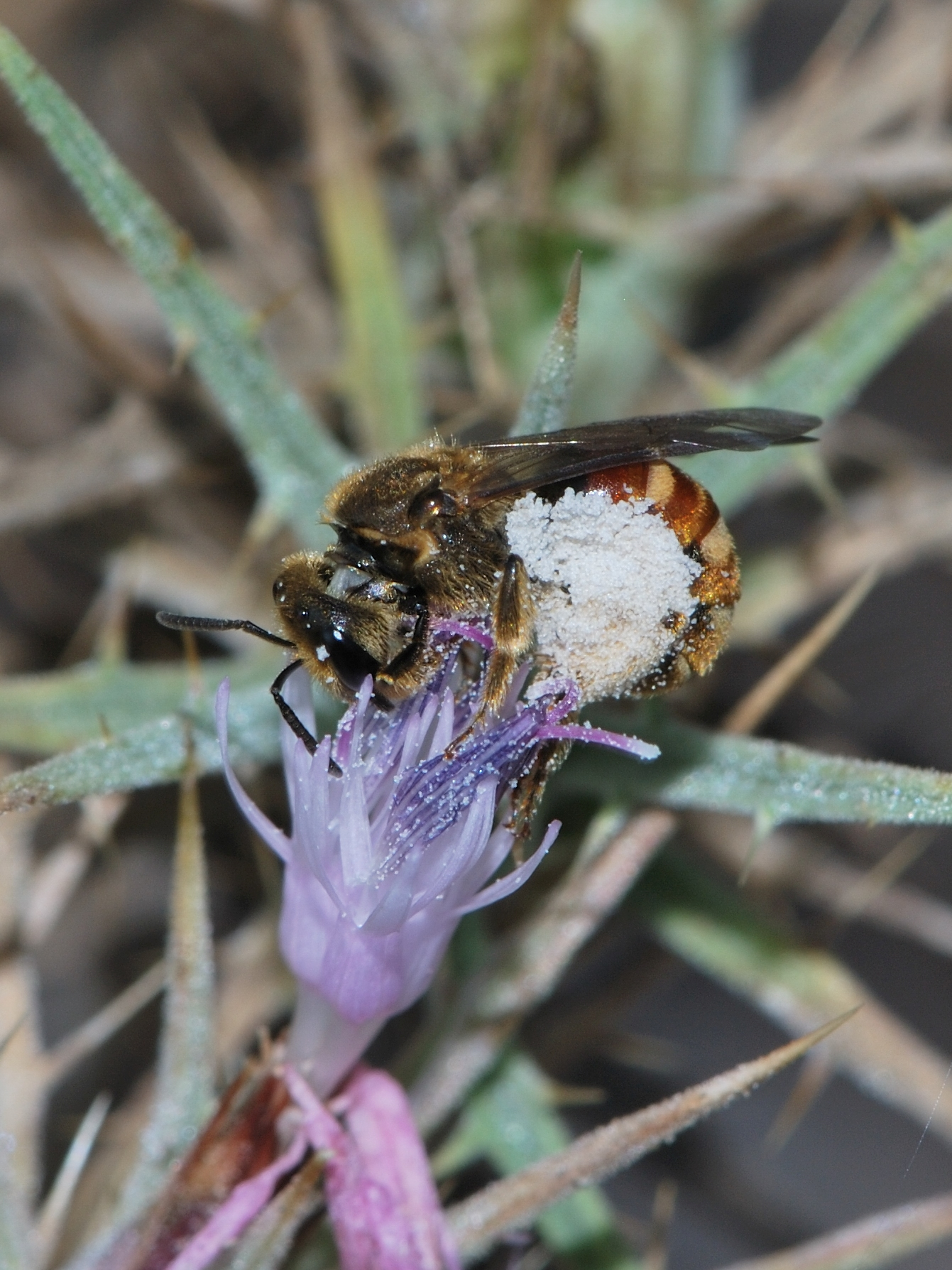
79. Lasioglossum nigripes, female
  Lasioglossum limbellum (Morawitz, 1876)
80. Lasioglossum lineare (Schenck, 1870)
81. Lasioglossum longirostre (Morawitz, 1876)
82. Lasioglossum lucidulum (Schenck, 1861)
83. Lasioglossum malachurum (Kirby, 1802) הליקטית רחבת-פסים
84. Lasioglossum mandibulare (Morawitz, 1866)
85. Lasioglossum marginatum (Brullé, 1832) הליקטית השוליים
86. Lasioglossum masculum (Pérez, 1895)
87. Lasioglossum mediterraneum (Blüthgen, 1926)
88. Lasioglossum mesosclerum (Pérez, 1903)
89. Lasioglossum minutissimum (Kirby, 1802)
90. Lasioglossum morio (Fabricius, 1793)
91. Lasioglossum mose Ebmer, 1974
92. Lasioglossum nabardicum (Blüthgen, 1931)
93. Lasioglossum nigripes (Lepeletier, 1841)
94. Lasioglossum obscuratum (Morawitz, 1876)
95. Lasioglossum ordubadense (Friese, 1916)
96. Lasioglossum pauxillum (Schenck, 1853)
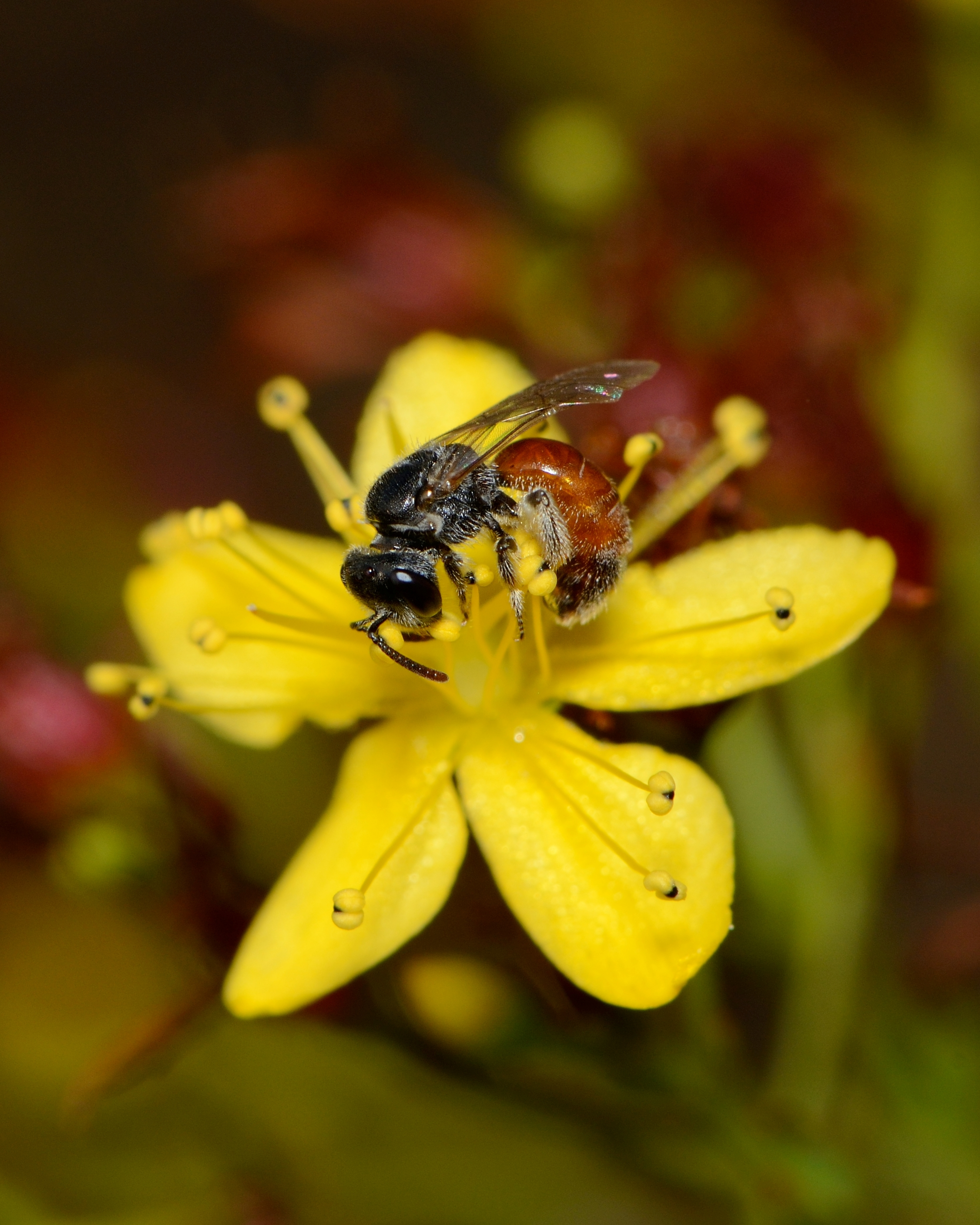
97. Lasioglossum pseudosphecodimorphum, female
  Lasioglossum peregrinum (Blüthgen, 1923)
98. Lasioglossum picipes (Morawitz, 1876)
99. Lasioglossum politum (Schenck, 1853)
100. Lasioglossum pseudolittorale (Blüthgen, 1923)
101. Lasioglossum pseudosphecodimorphum (Blüthgen, 1923)
102. Lasioglossum punctatissimum (Schenck, 1853)
103. Lasioglossum puncticolle (Morawitz, 1872)
104. Lasioglossum pygmaeum (Schenck, 1853)
105. Lasioglossum soror (Saunders, 1901)
106. Lasioglossum subaenescens (Pérez, 1896)
107. Lasioglossum tadschicum (Blüthgen, 1929)
108. Lasioglossum transitorium (Schenck, 1868)
109. Lasioglossum truncaticolle (Morawitz, 1877)
110. Lasioglossum vagans (Smith, 1857)
111. Lasioglossum villosulum (Kirby, 1802)
112. Lasioglossum xanthopus (Kirby, 1802)
113. Nomioides bluethgeni Pesenko, 1979
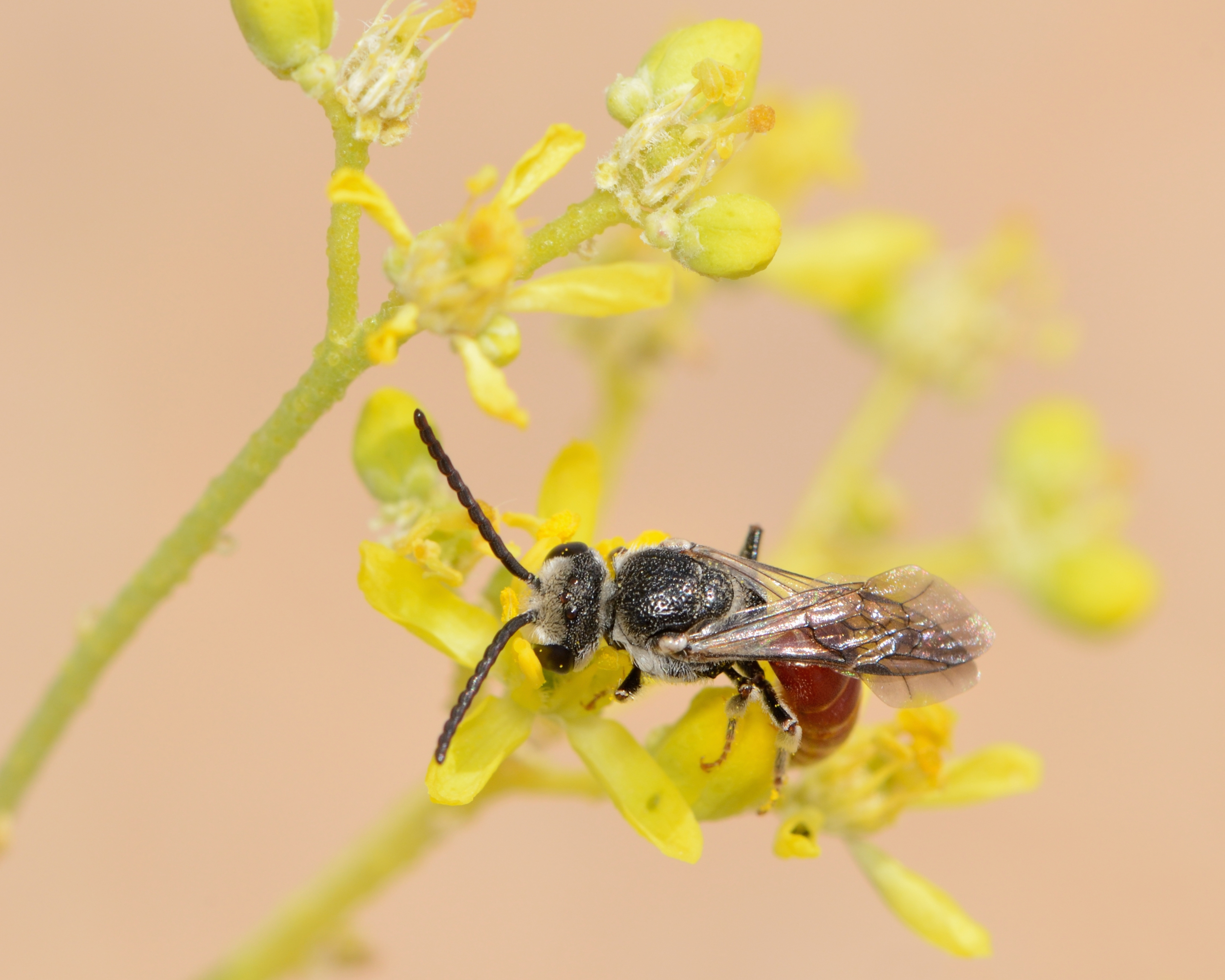
114. Sphecodes olivieri, male
  Nomioides deceptor Saunders, 1908
115. Nomioides facilis (Smith, 1853)
116. Nomioides klausi Pesenko, 1983
117. Nomioides minutissimus (Rossi, 1790)
118. Nomioides ornatus Pesenko, 1983
119. Nomioides rotundiceps Handlirsch, 1888
120. Nomioides similis Pesenko, 1983
121. Nomioides squamiger Saunders, 1908
122. Nomioides turanicus Morawitz, 1876
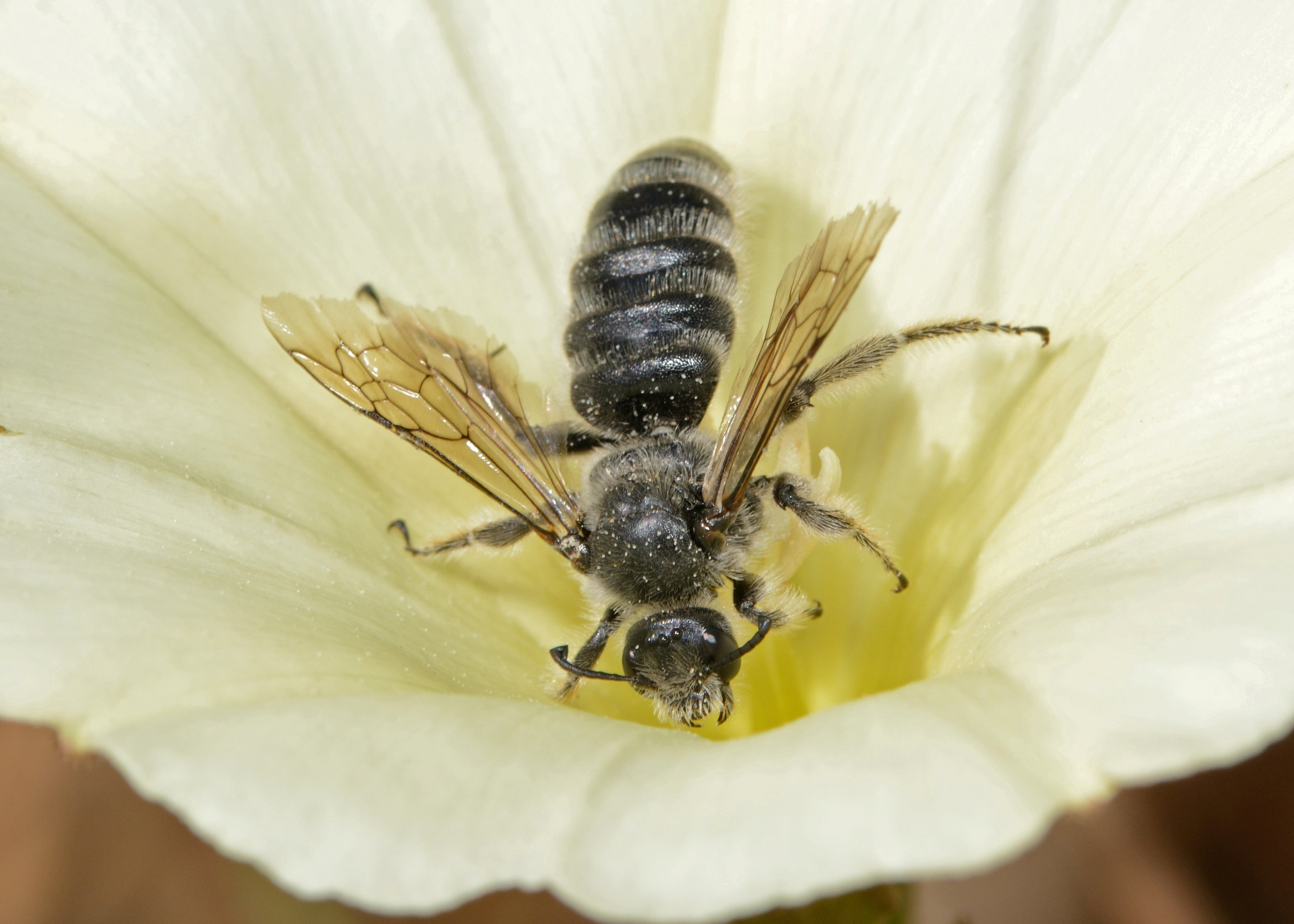
123. Systropha anatolica, male
  Pseudapis bispinosa (Brulle, 1832)
124. Pseudapis bytinski (Warncke, 1976)
125. Pseudapis diversipes (Latreille, 1806)
126. Pseudapis equestris (Gerstäcker, 1872)
127. Pseudapis inermis (Morawitz, 1895)
128. Pseudapis monstrosa (Costa, 1861)
129. Pseudapis nilotica (Smith, 1875)
130. Pseudapis patellata (Magretti, 1884)
131. Pseudapis valga (Gerstäcker, 1872)
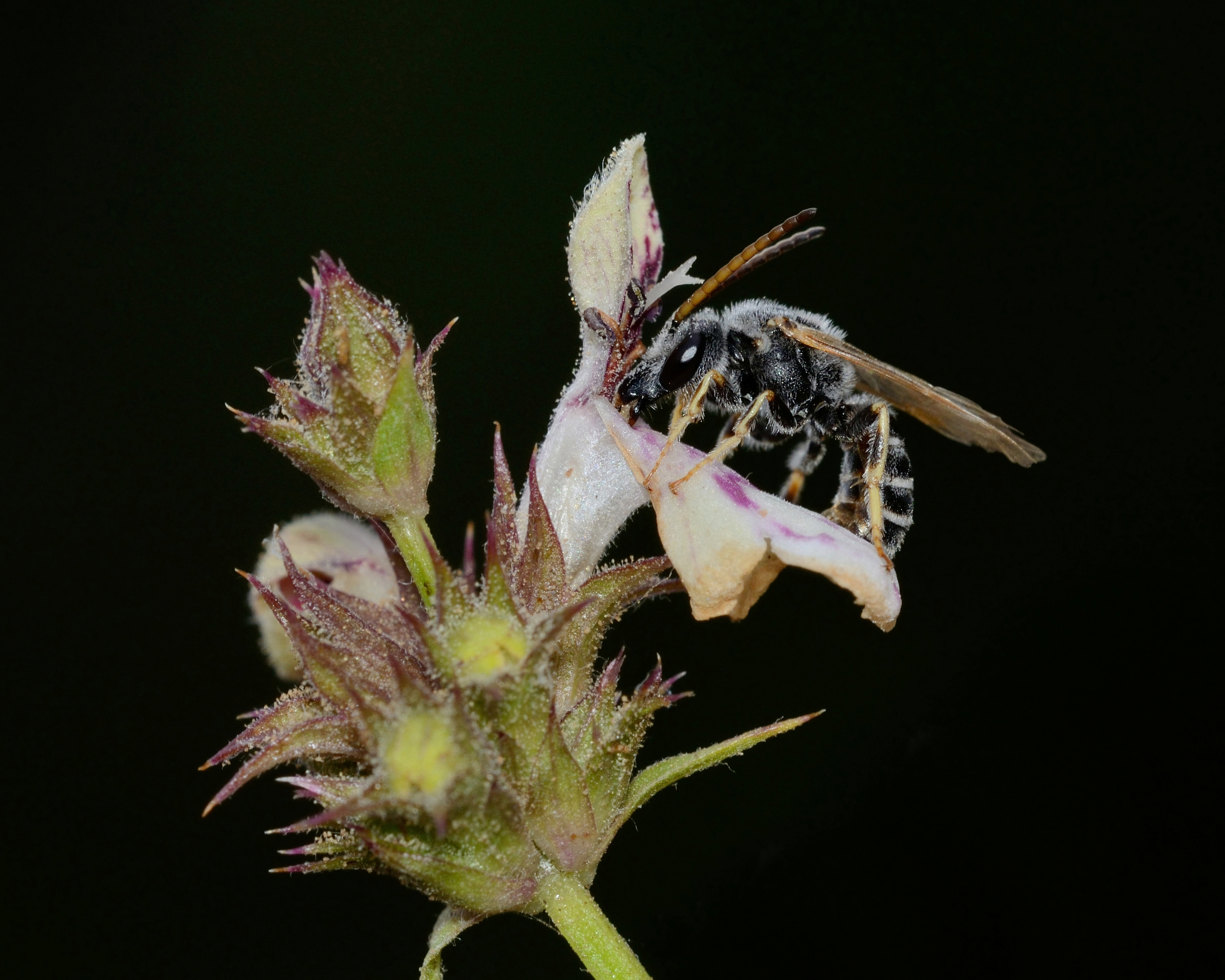
132. Thrincohalictus prognathus, male
  Rophites algirus Pérez, 1895
133. Rophites hartmanni Friese, 1902
134. Rophites nigripes Friese 1902
135. Sphecodes albilabris (Fabricius, 1793)
136. Sphecodes alternatus Smith, 1853
137. Sphecodes crassus Thomson, 1870
138. Sphecodes gibbus (Linnaeus, 1785)
139. Sphecodes longulus Hagens, 1882
140. Sphecodes monilicornis (Kirby, 1802)
141. Sphecodes olivieri Lepeletier, 1825
142. Sphecodes pinguiculus Pérez, 1903
143. Sphecodes puncticeps Thomson, 1870
144. Sphecodes ruficrus (Erichson, 1835)
145. Sphecodes schenckii Hagens, 1882
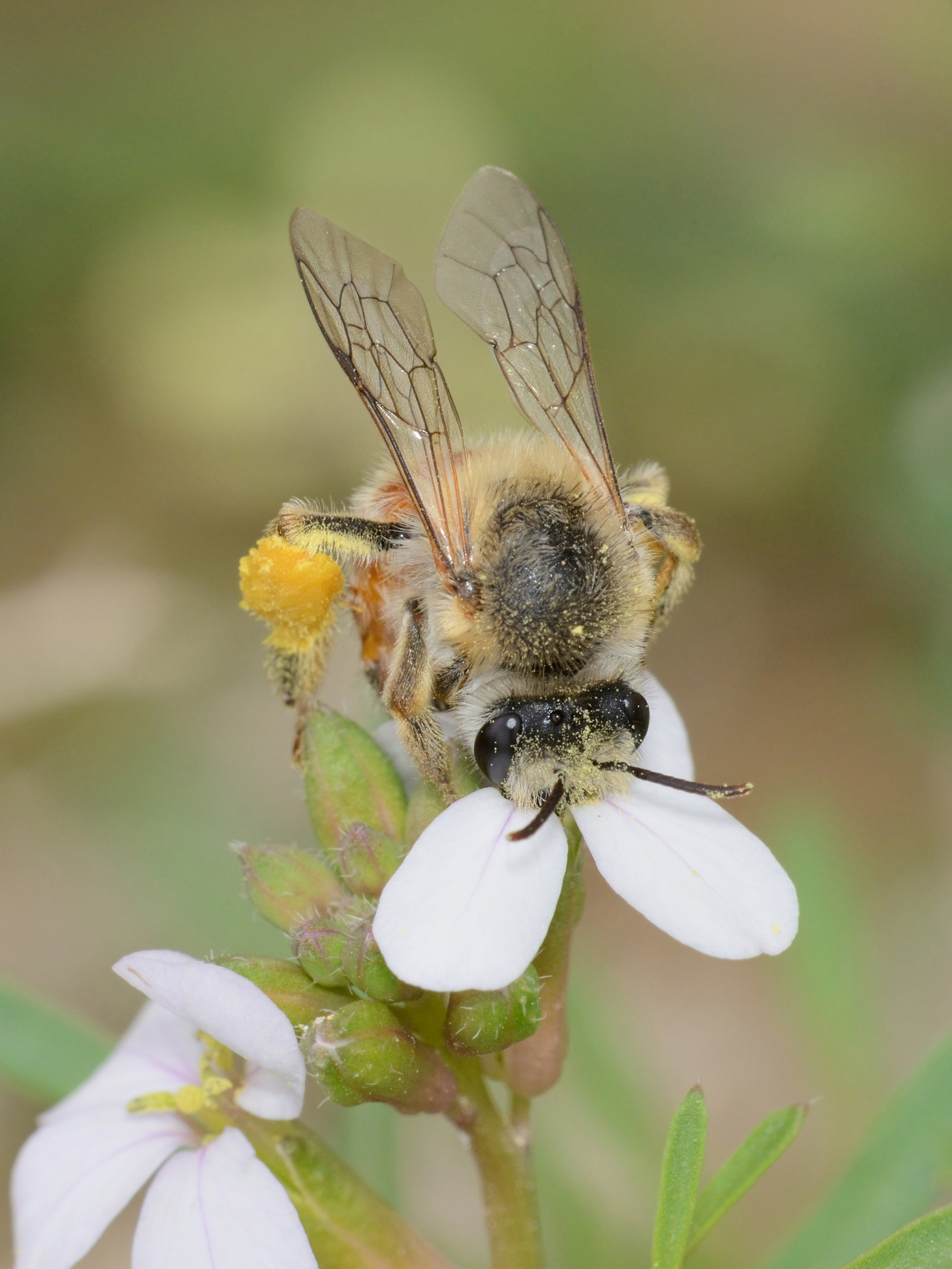
146. Melitta maura, female
  Systropha hirsuta Spinola, 1839
147. Systropha planidens Giraud, 1861
148. Thrincohalictus prognathus (Pérez, 1912)

=== Melittidae ===
1. Dasypoda albipila Spinola, 1838
2. Dasypoda toroki Michez, 2004
3. Melitta aegyptiaca (Radoszkowski, 1891)
4. Melitta maura (Pérez, 1896)
5. Melitta schmiedeknechti Friese, 1898

=== Megachilidae ===
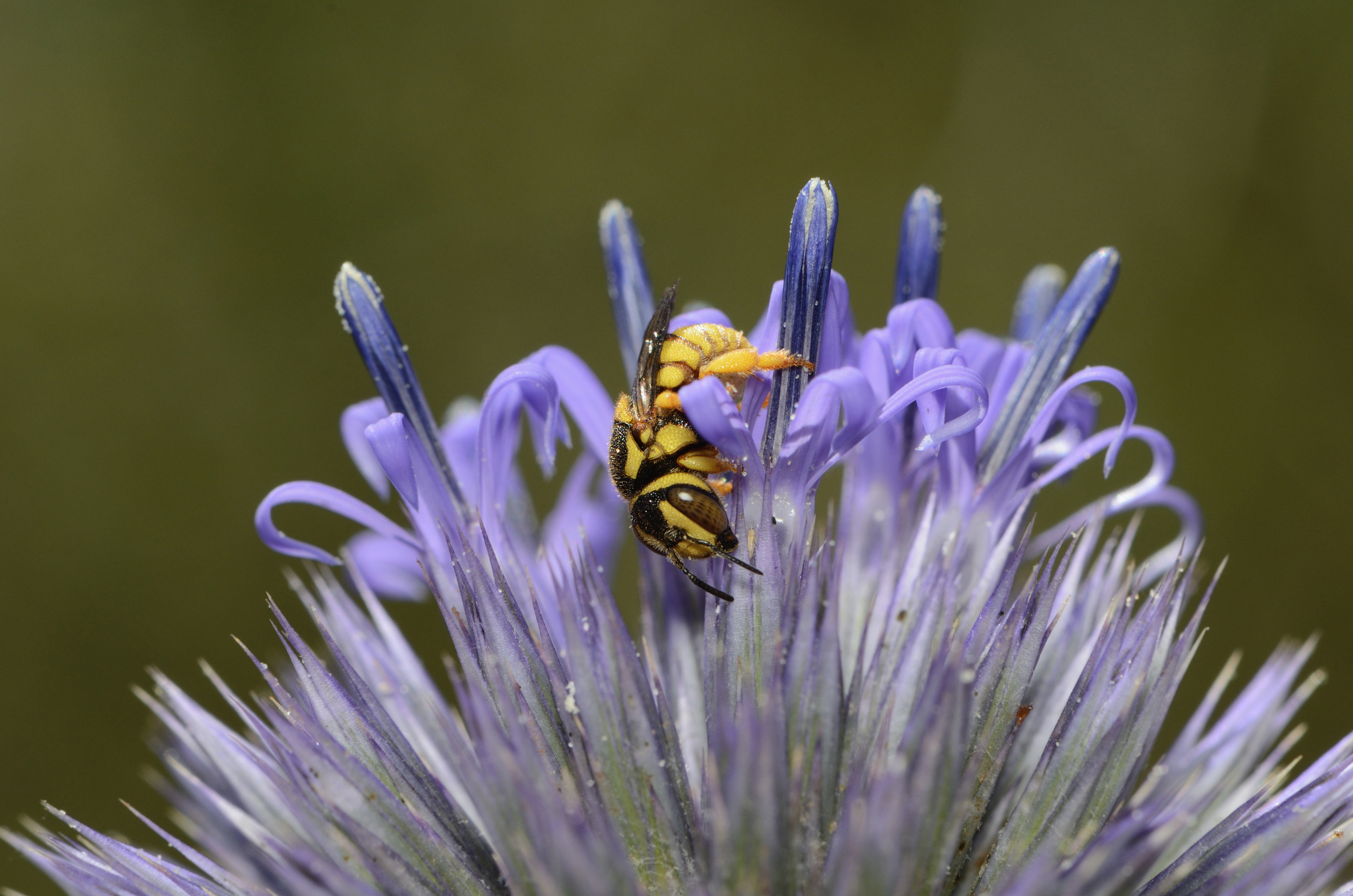
1. Anthidiellum strigatum, female
  Afranthidium carduele (Morawitz, 1876)
2. Afranthidium lebanense (Mavromoustakis, 1955)
3. Allodioxys ammobius (Mavromoustakis, 1954)
4. Allodioxys schulthessi (Popov, 1936)
5. Anthidiellum breviusculum (Pérez, 1890)
6. Anthidiellum strigatum (Panzer, 1805)
7. Anthidium anguliventre Morawitz, 1888
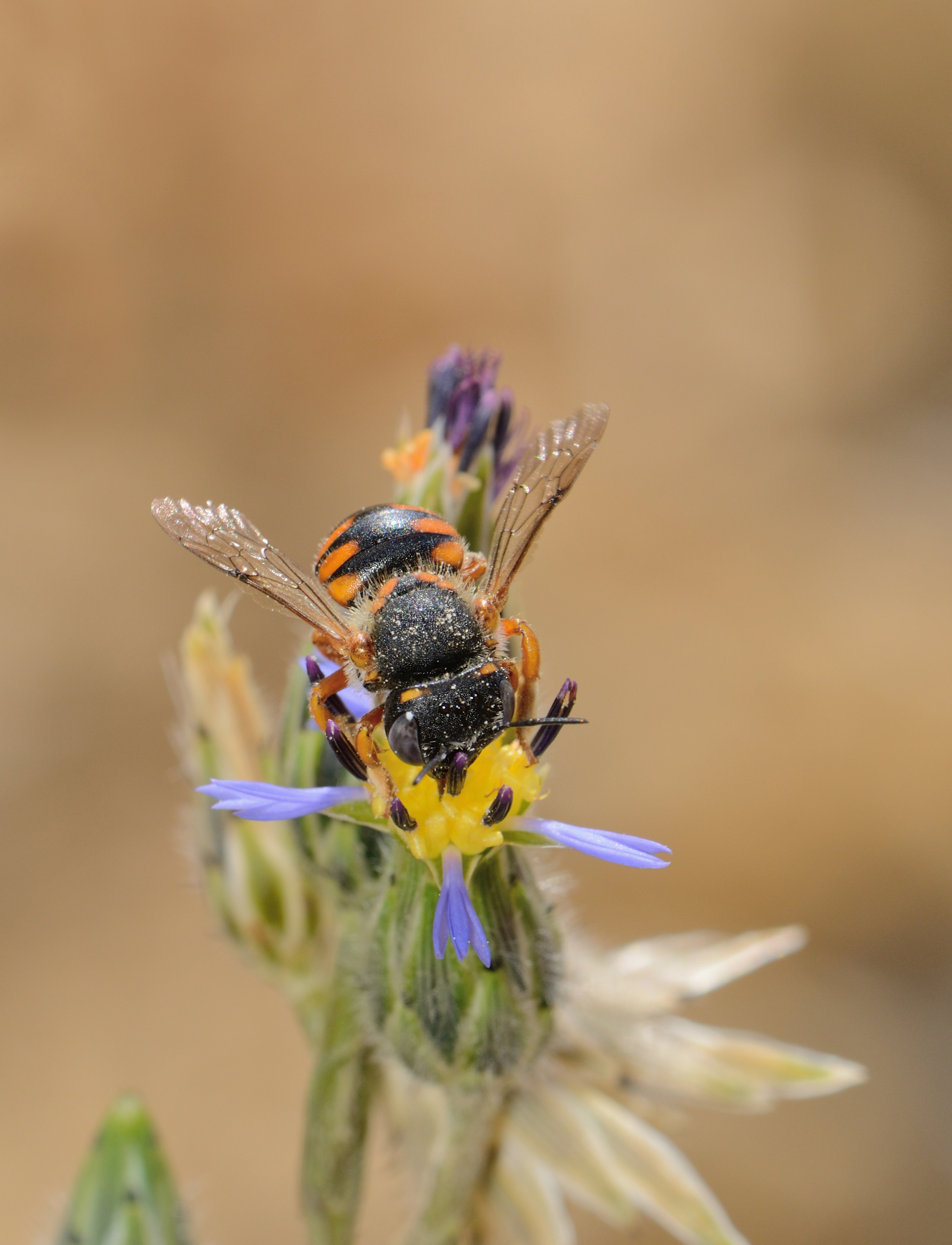
8. Anthidium auritum, female
  Anthidium auritum Klug, 1832
9. Anthidium diadema Latreille, 1809
10. Anthidium echinatum Klug, 1832
11. Anthidium eremicum Alfken, 1938
12. Anthidium loti Perris, 1852
13. Anthidium punctatum Latreille, 1809
14. Anthidium spiniventre Friese, 1899
15. Anthidium syriacum Pérez, 1895
16. Anthidium taeniatum Latreille, 1809
17. Anthidium tesselatum Klug, 1832
18. Anthidium undulatum Dours, 1873
19. Chelostoma bytinskii (Mavromoustakis, 1948)
20. Chelostoma comosum Müller, 2012
21. Chelostoma diodon Schletterer, 1889
22. Chelostoma distinctum (Stöckhert, 1929)
23. Chelostoma forcipatum (Benoist, 1928)
24. Chelostoma hebraeum (Benoist, 1935)
25. Chelostoma isabellinum (Warncke, 1991)
26. Chelostoma maidli (Benoist, 1935)
27. Chelostoma mocsaryi Schletterer, 1889
28. Chelostoma palaestinum (Benoist, 1935)
29. Chelostoma rapunculi (Lepeletier, 1841)
30. Chelostoma schlettereri (Friese, 1899)
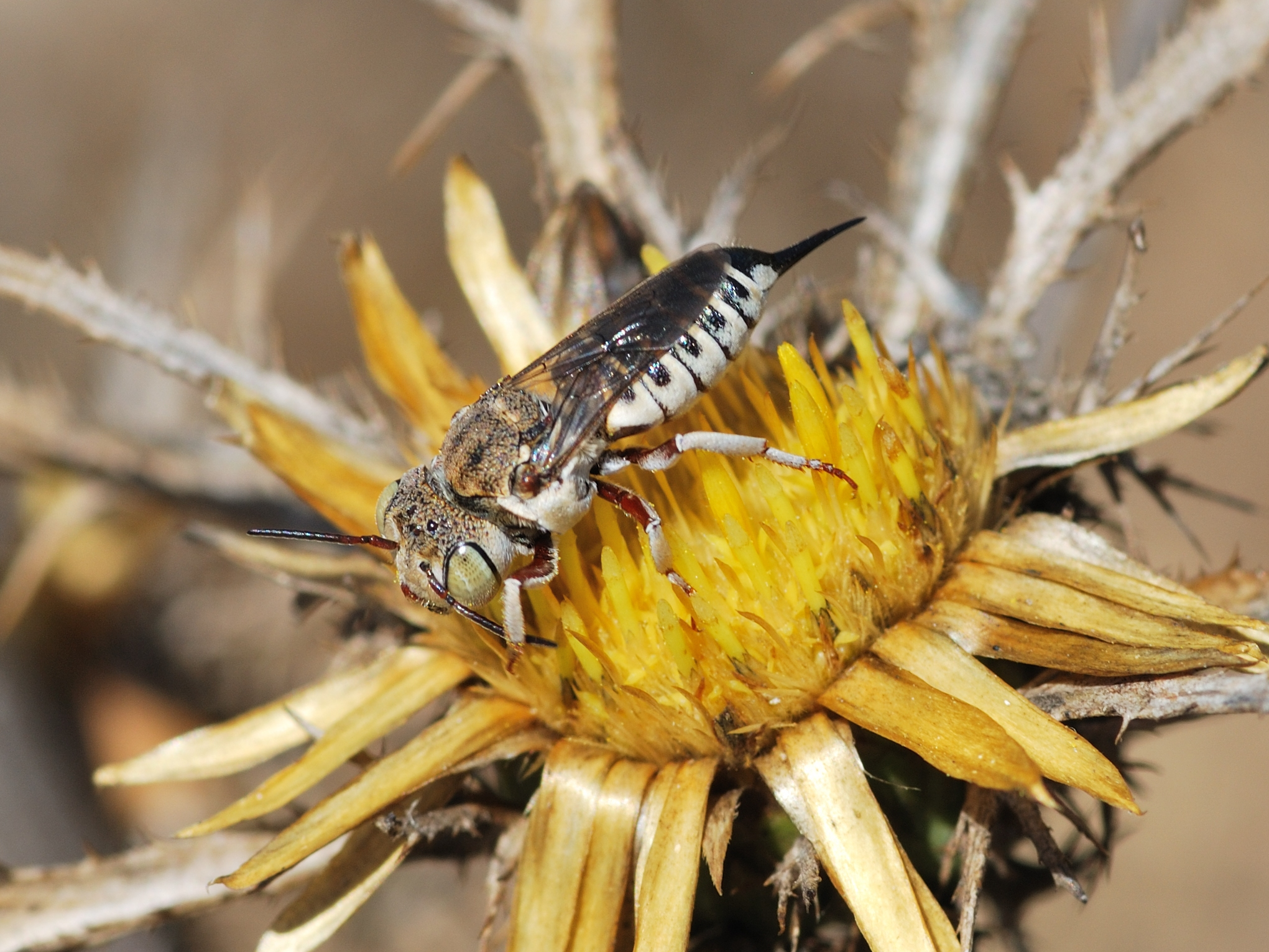
31. Coelioxys acanthura, female
  Coelioxys acanthura (Illiger 1806)
32. Coelioxys afra Lepeletier 1841
33. Coelioxys argentea Lepeletier, 1841
34. Coelioxys artemis Schwarz, 2001
35. Coelioxys brevis Eversmann, 1852
36. Coelioxys caudata Spinola, 1838
37. Coelioxys decipiens Spinola, 1838
38. Coelioxys elegantula Alfken, 1934
39. Coelioxys elongatus Alfken, 1938
40. Coelioxys elsei Schwarz, 2001
41. Coelioxys emarginatella Pasteels, 1982
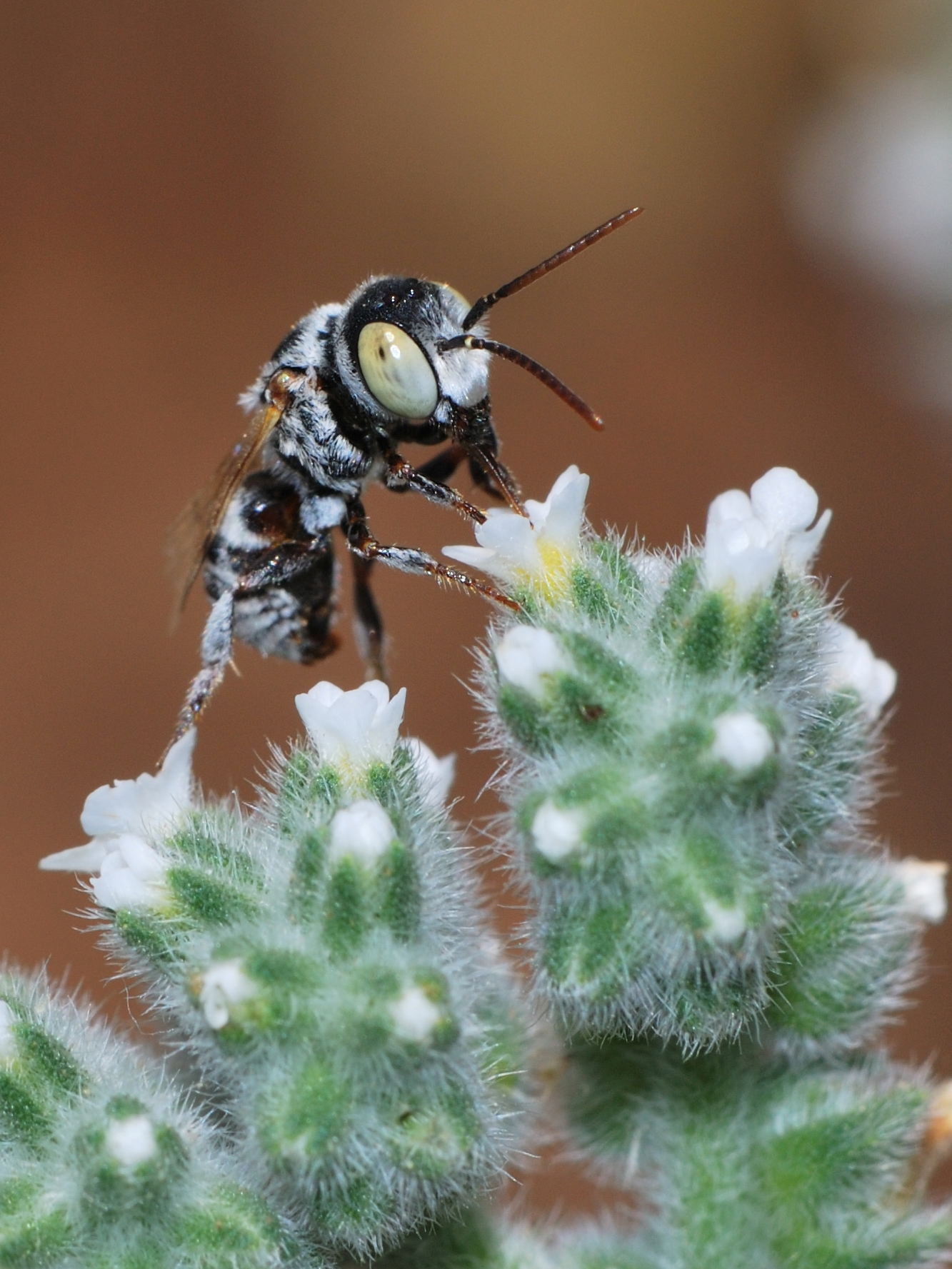
42. Haetosmia vechti, male
  Coelioxys haemorrhoa Foerster, 1853
43. Coelioxys mielbergi Morawitz, 1880
44. Coelioxys polycentris Forster, 1853
45. Coelioxys sogdiana Morawitz, 1875
46. Dioxys cincta (Jurine, 1807)
47. Dioxys pumila Gerstaecker, 1869
48. Ensliniana bidentata (Friese, 1899)
49. Eoanthidium insulare (Morawitz, 1873)
50. Eoanthidium judaeense (Mavromoustakis, 1945)
51. Eudioxys quadrispinosa (Friese, 1899)
52. Haetosmia circumventa (Peters, 1974)
53. Haetosmia vechti (Peters, 1974)
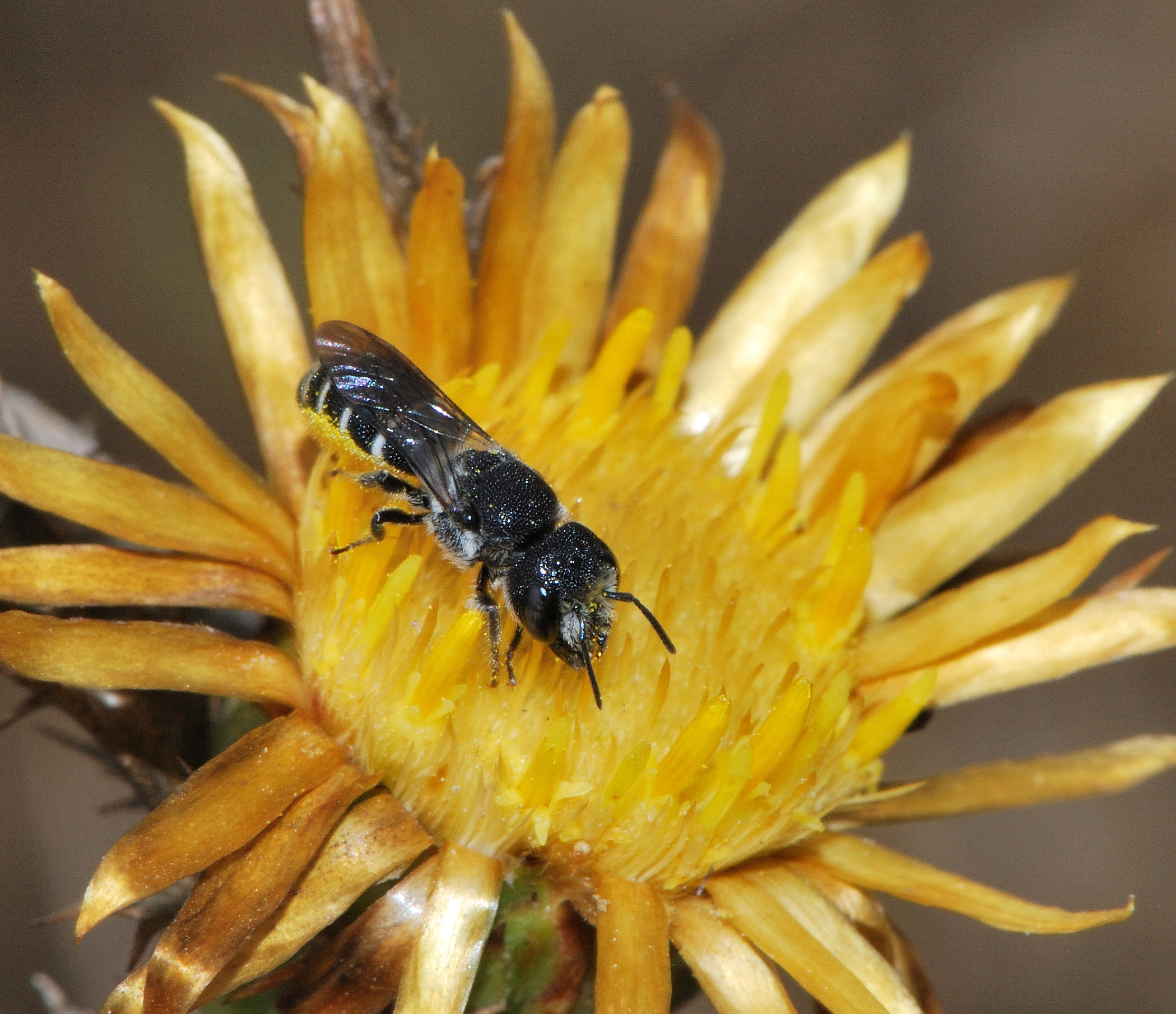
54. Heriades truncorum, female
  Heriades clavicornis Morawitz, 1875
55. Heriades dalmaticus Maidl, 1922
56. Heriades hierosolomitus Benoist, 1935
57. Heriades punctulifer Schletterer, 1889
58. Heriades rubicolus Pérez, 1890
59. Heriades truncorum (Linnaeus, 1758)
60. Hofferia schmiedeknechti (Schletterer, 1889)
61. Hoplitis abnormis Zanden, 1992
62. Hoplitis acuticornis (Dufour & Perris, 1840)
63. Hoplitis africana (Warncke, 1990)
64. Hoplitis agis (Benoist, 1929)
65. Hoplitis anipuncta (Alfken, 1935)
66. Hoplitis annulata (Latreille, 1811)
67. Hoplitis antalyae Tkalců, 2000
68. Hoplitis aravensis (Zanden, 1992)
69. Hoplitis batyamae (Zanden, 1986)
70. Hoplitis bifoveolata (Alfken, 1935)
71. Hoplitis bisulca (Gerstacker, 1869)
72. Hoplitis brachypogon (Pérez, 1879)
73. Hoplitis bytinskii (Mavromoustakis, 1948)
74. Hoplitis campanularis (Morawitz, 1877)
75. Hoplitis christae (Warncke, 1991)
76. Hoplitis ciliaris (Pérez, 1902)
77. Hoplitis cypriaca (Mavromoustakis, 1938)
78. Hoplitis daniana (Mavromoustakis, 1949)
79. Hoplitis denticulata (Zanden, 1992)
80. Hoplitis desertorum Müller, 2014
81. Hoplitis eburnea (Warncke, 1991)
82. Hoplitis enslini (Alfken, 1935)
83. Hoplitis erythrogastra (Mavromoustakis, 1954)
84. Hoplitis fertoni (Pérez, 1890)
85. Hoplitis flabellifera (Morice, 1901)
86. Hoplitis gerofita (Warncke, 1990)
87. Hoplitis hartliebi (Friese, 1899)
88. Hoplitis helouanensis (Friese, 1899)
89. Hoplitis hemisphaerica (Alfken, 1935)
90. Hoplitis hierichonica (Mavromoustakis, 1949)
91. Hoplitis hofferi Tkalcu, 1977
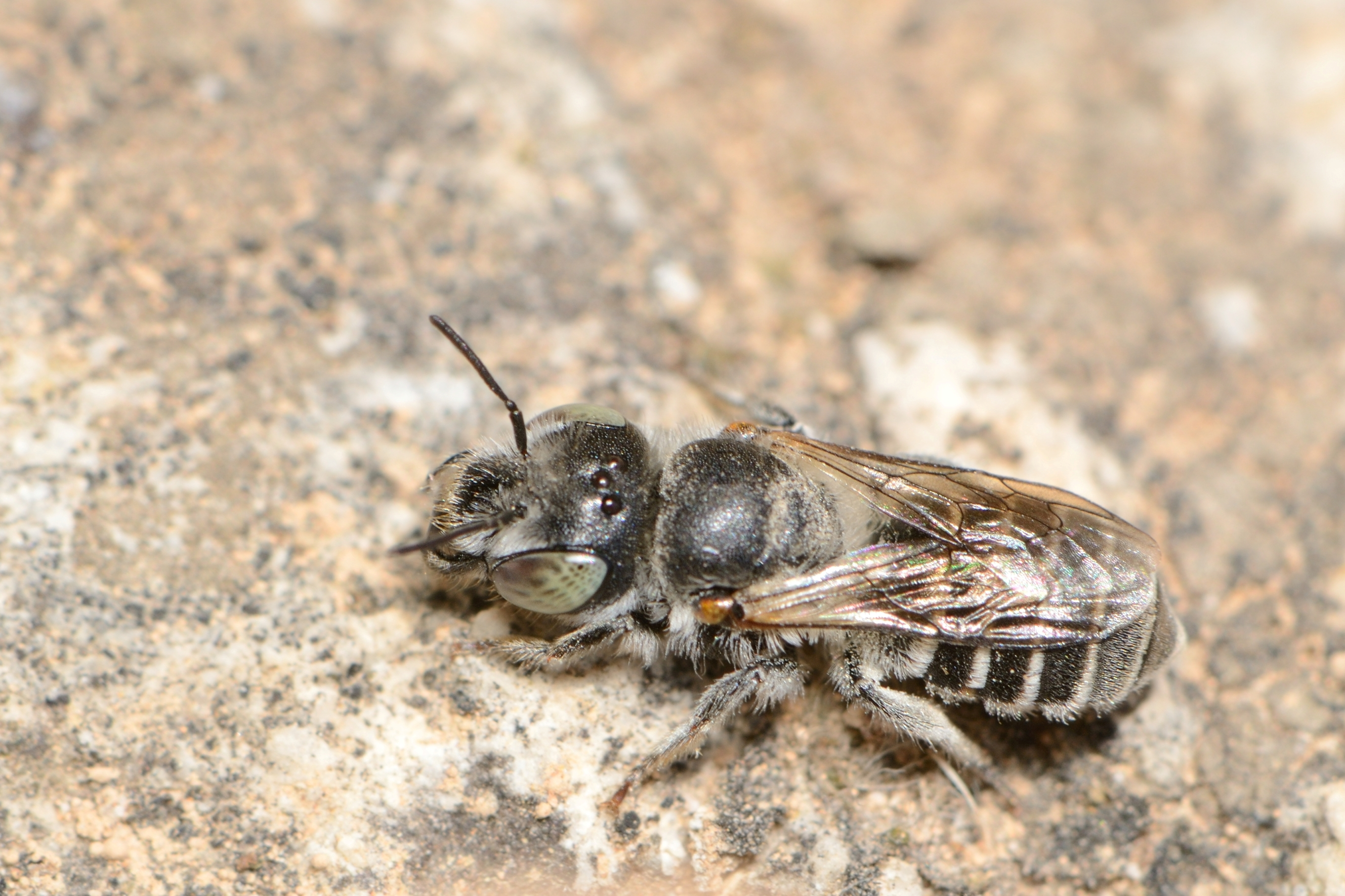
92. Hoplitis homalocera
  Hoplitis homalocera Zanden, 1991
93. Hoplitis improceros Zanden, 1998
94. Hoplitis israelica (Warncke, 1991)
95. Hoplitis jordanica (Warncke, 1991)
96. Hoplitis leiocephala (Mavromoustakis, 1954)
97. Hoplitis libanensis (Morice, 1901)
98. Hoplitis limassolica (Mavromoustakis, 1937)
99. Hoplitis lysholmi (Friese, 1899)
100. Hoplitis meyeri (Benoist, 1934)
101. Hoplitis minor (Morawitz, 1877)
102. Hoplitis mocsaryi (Friese, 1895)
103. Hoplitis moricei (Friese, 1899)
104. Hoplitis mucida (Dours, 1873)
105. Hoplitis negevensis (Warncke, 1991)
106. Hoplitis obtusa (Friese, 1899)
107. Hoplitis onychophora (Mavromoustakis, 1939)
108. Hoplitis pallicornis (Friese, 1895)
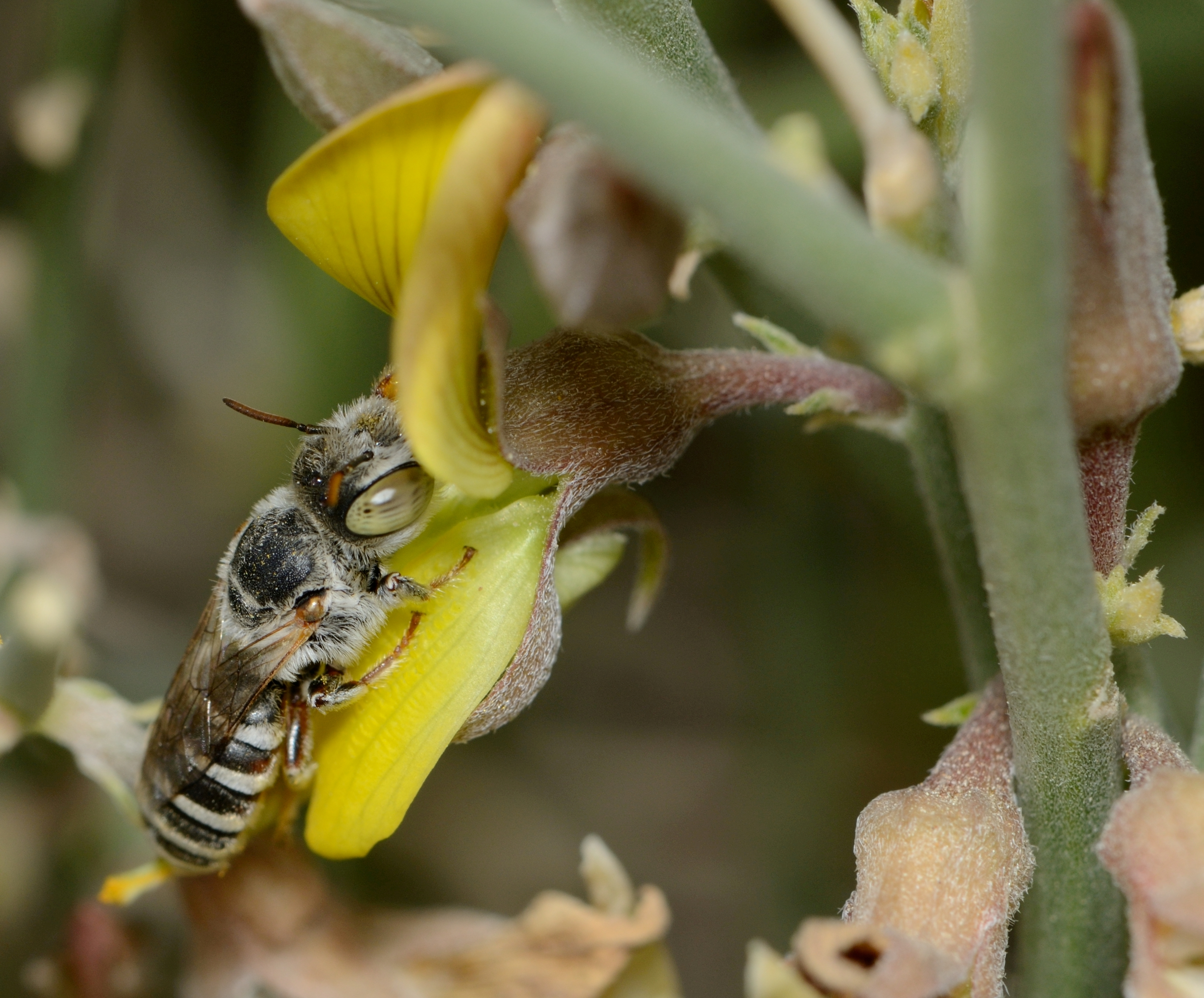
109. Hoplitis parana, female
  Hoplitis parana (Warncke, 1991)
110. Hoplitis paralias (Mavromoustakis, 1954)
111. Hoplitis perezi (Ferton, 1895)
112. Hoplitis praestans (Morawitz, 1894)
113. Hoplitis quinquespinosa (Friese, 1899)
114. Hoplitis rubricrus (Friese, 1899)
115. Hoplitis rufopicta (Morawitz, 1875)
116. Hoplitis semirubra (Friese, 1899)
117. Hoplitis segura (Warncke, 1991)
118. Hoplitis serainae Müller, 2012
119. Hoplitis sordida (Benoist, 1929)
120. Hoplitis subbutea (Warncke, 1991)
121. Hoplitis tridentata (Dufour and Perris, 1840)
122. Hoplitis tunica (Warncke, 1991)
123. Hoplitis unispina (Alfken, 1935)
124. Hoplitis verhoeffi (Mavromoustakis, 1954)
125. Hoplitis wadicola (Alfken, 1935)
126. Hoplitis wahrmani (Mavromoustakis, 1948) אוסמיית הפרג
127. Hoplitis yermasoyiae (Mavromoustakis, 1938)
128. Hoplitis testaceozonata (Alfken, 1935)
129. Hoplitis tridentata (Dufour & Perris, 1840)
130. Hoplitis zonalis (Pérez, 1895)
131. Icteranthidium decoloratum (Alfken, 1932)
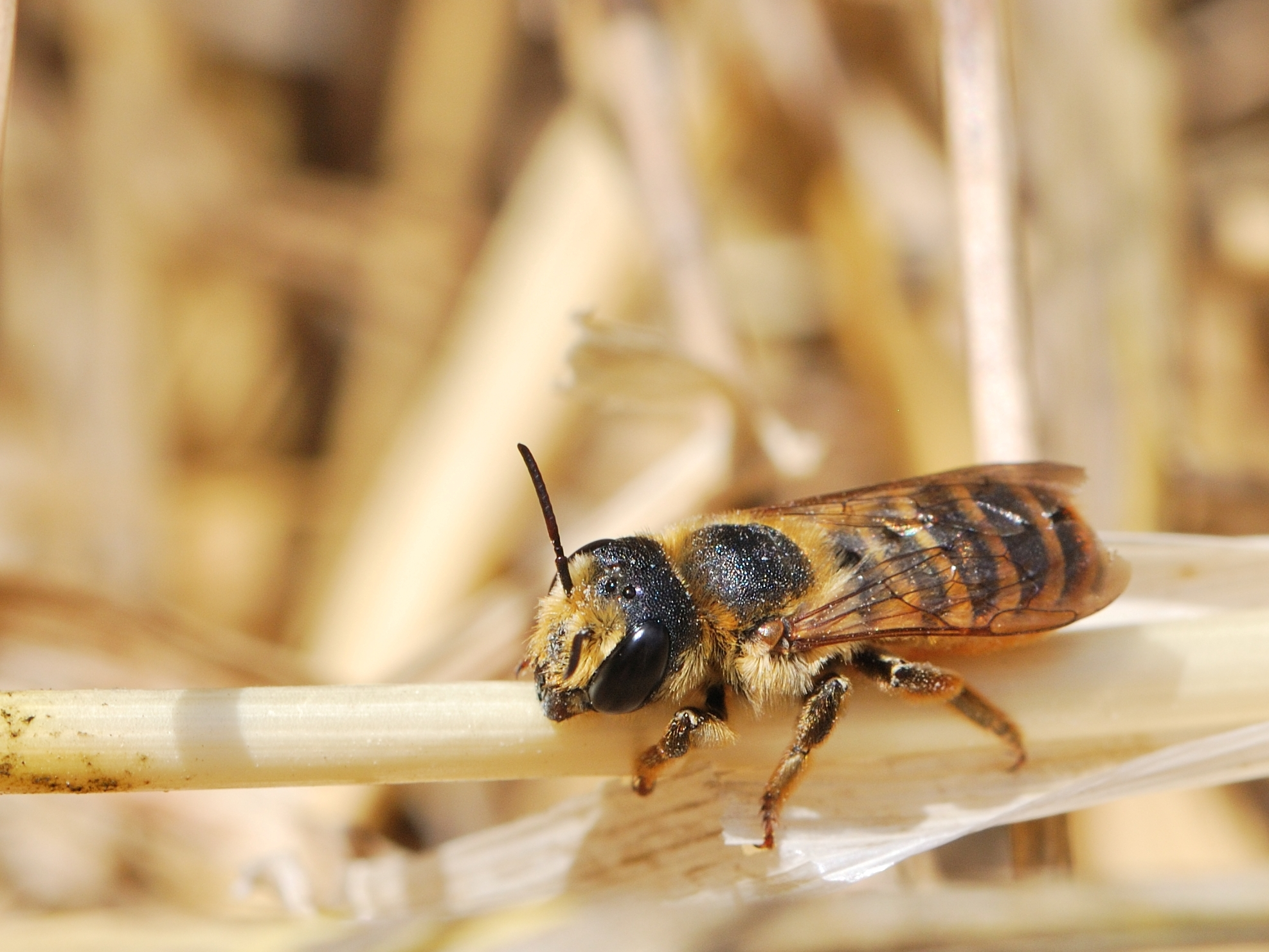
132. Megachile albisecta, female
  Icteranthidium ferrugineum (Fabricius, 1787)
133. Icteranthidium grohmanni (Spinola, 1838)
134. Lithurgus chrysurus (Fonscolombe, 1834)
135. Lithurgus tibialis Morawitz, 1875
136. Megachile albisecta (Klug, 1817)
137. Megachile albonotata Radoszkowski, 1886
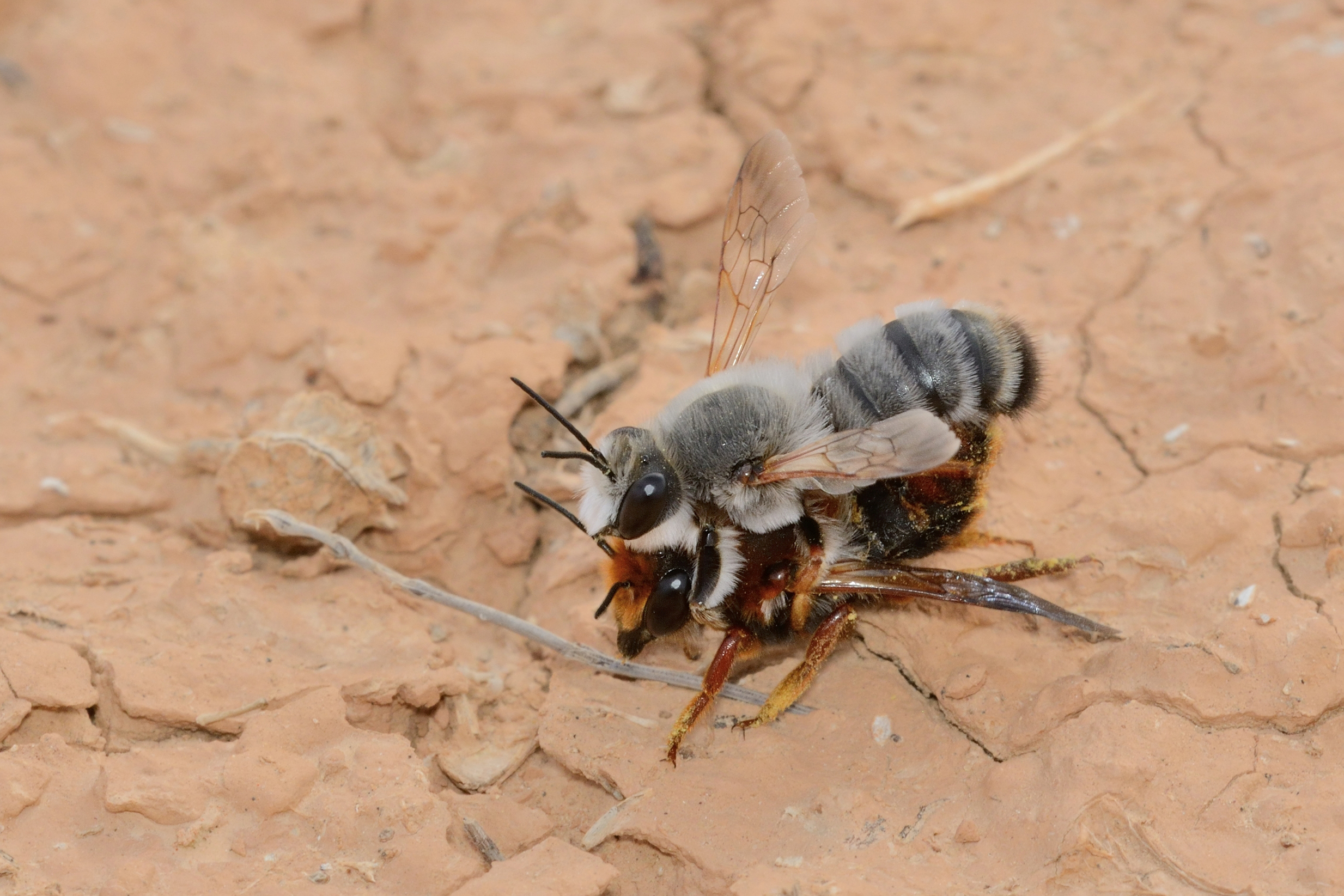
138. Megachile incerta, copulation
  Megachile apicalis Spinola, 1808
139. Megachile asiatica Morawitz, 1875
140. Megachile atrocastanea (Alfken, 1932)
141. Megachile centuncularis (Linnaeus, 1758)
142. Megachile cinnamomea Alfken, 1926
143. Megachile concinna Smith, 1879
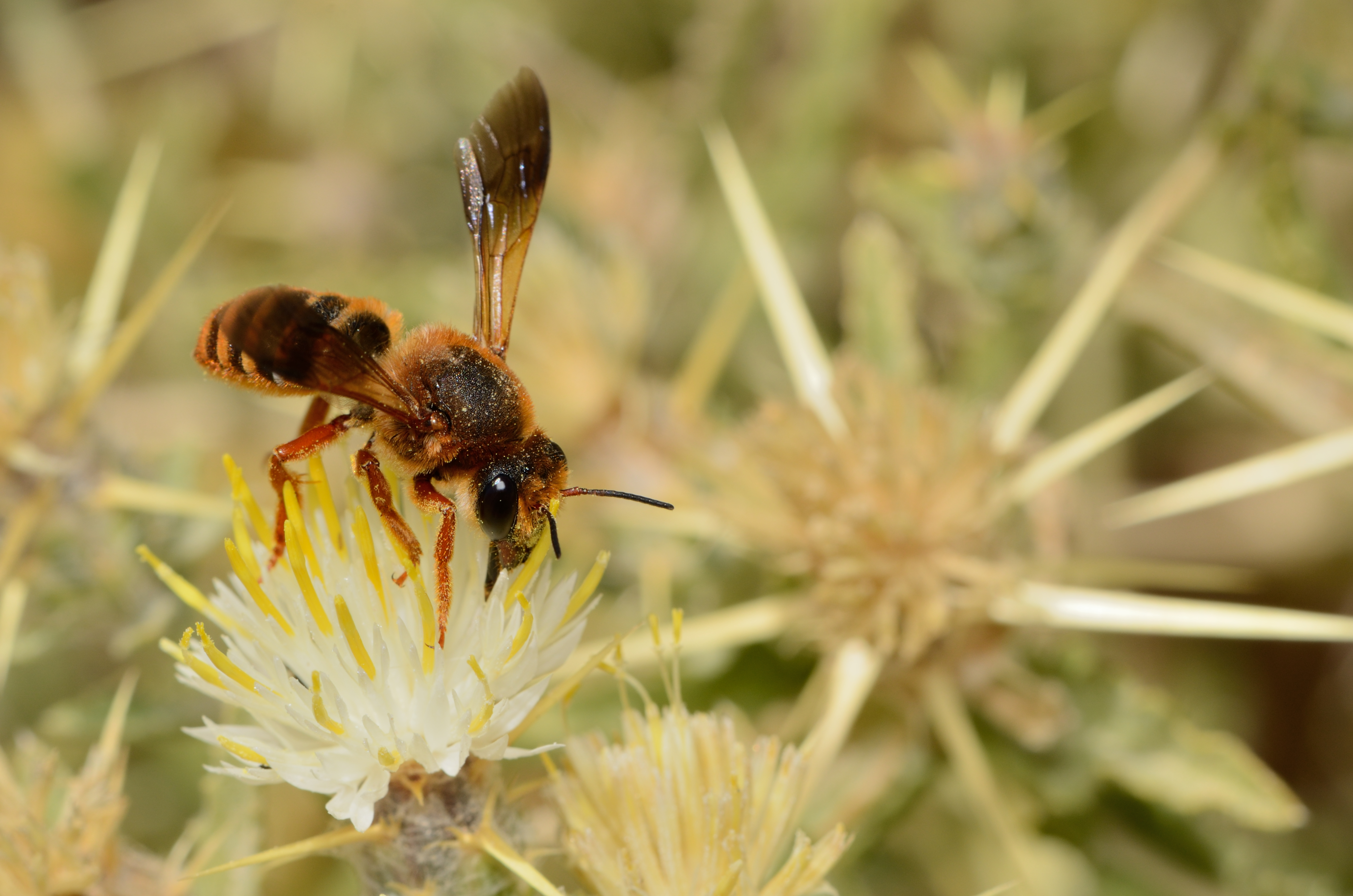
144. Megachile judaea, female
  Megachile dorsalis Pérez, 1879
145. Megachile esseniensis (Pasteels, 1979)
146. Megachile flabellipes Pérez, 1895
147. Megachile flavipes Spinola, 1838
148. Megachile giraudi Gerstaecker, 1869
149. Megachile hungarica Mocsáry, 1877
150. Megachile incerta Radoszkowski, 1876 בנאית הדורה
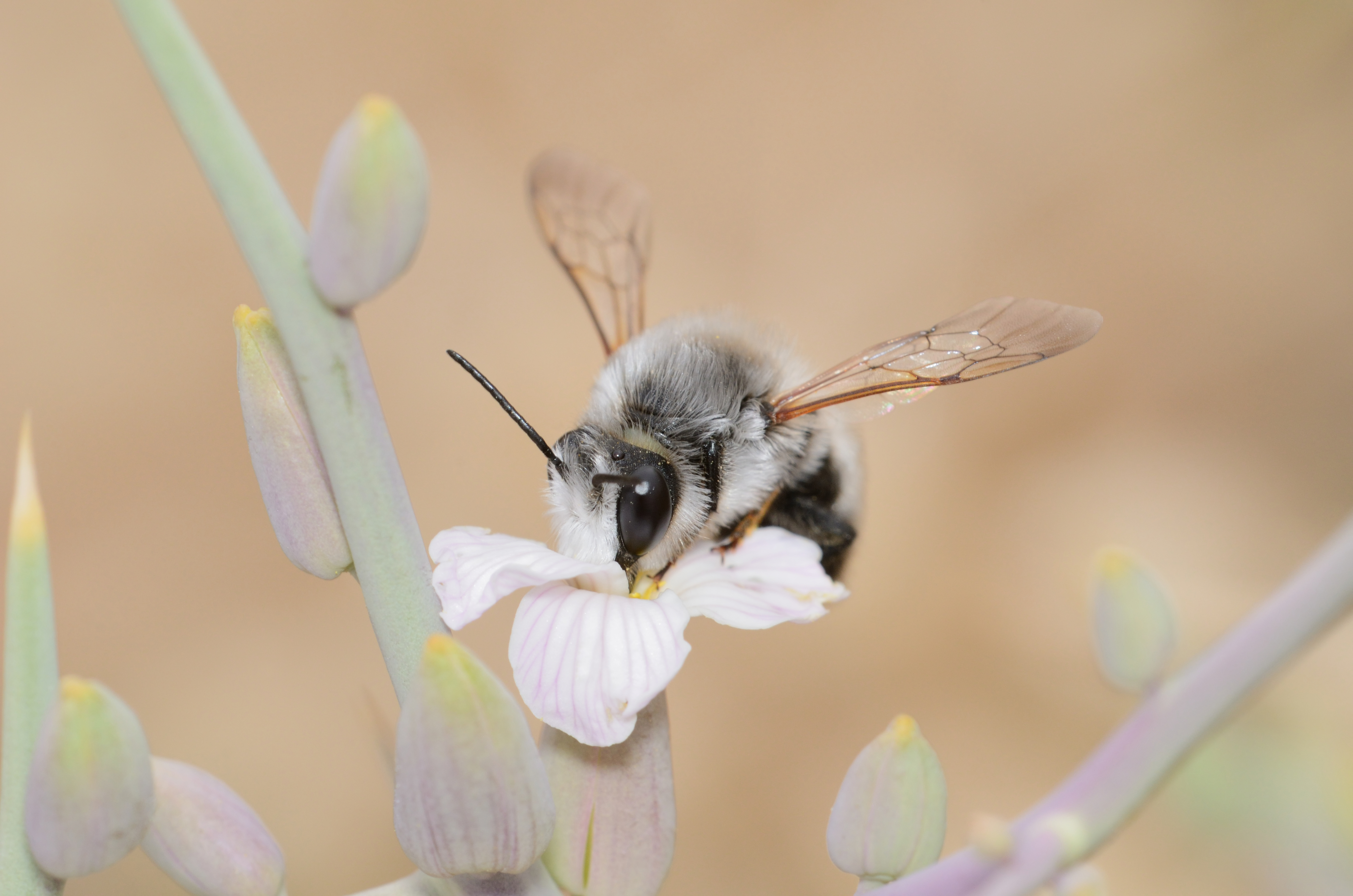
151. Megachile nigrita, male
  Megachile inexspectata Rebmann, 1968
152. Megachile insignis van der Zanden, 1996
153. Megachile judaea (Tkalců, 1999)
154. Megachile lagopoda (Linnaeus, 1761)
155. Megachile leucomalla Gerstaecker, 1869
156. Megachile levistriga Alfken, 1934
157. Megachile manicata Giraud, 1861
158. Megachile maxillosa Guérin-Méneville, 1845 בנאית הנגב
159. Megachile melanopyga Costa, 1863
160. Megachile monstrifica Morawitz, 1877
161. Megachile montenegrensis Dours, 1873
162. Megachile nigrita Radoszkowski, 1876
163. Megachile palaestina (Tkalců, 1988)
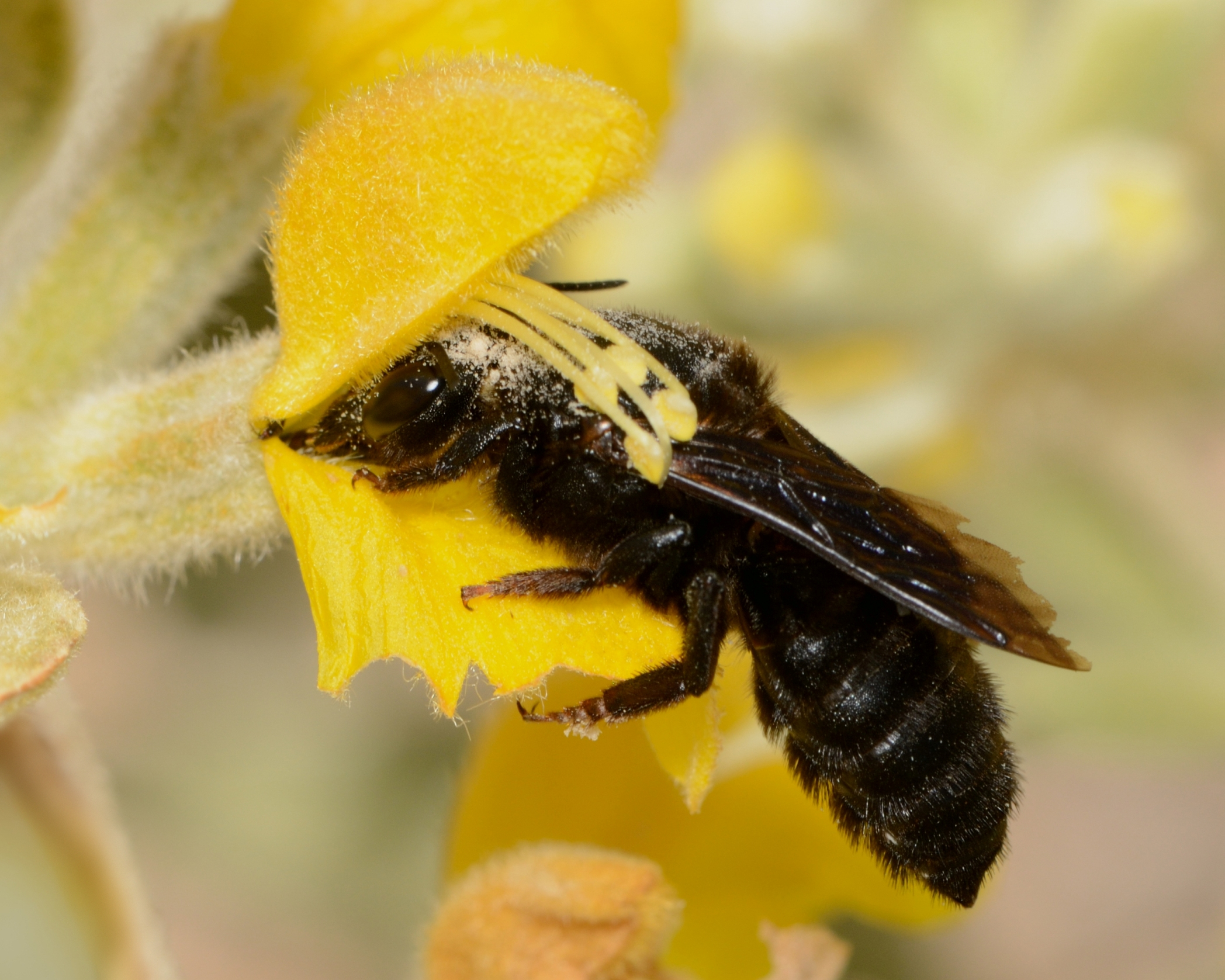
164. Megachile parietina, female
  Megachile parietina (Geoffroy, 1785) בנאית שחורה
165. Megachile picicornis Morawitz, 1853
166. Megachile pilicrus Morawitz, 1877
167. Megachile pyrenaica Lepeletier, 1841
168. Megachile rotundata (Fabricious, 1793) גזרנית מעוגלת
169. Megachile sicula (Rossi, 1792) בנאית אדמונית
170. Megachile tkalcui van der Zanden, 1996
171. Megachile walkeri Dalla Torre 1896
172. Metadioxys formosa (Morawitz 1875)
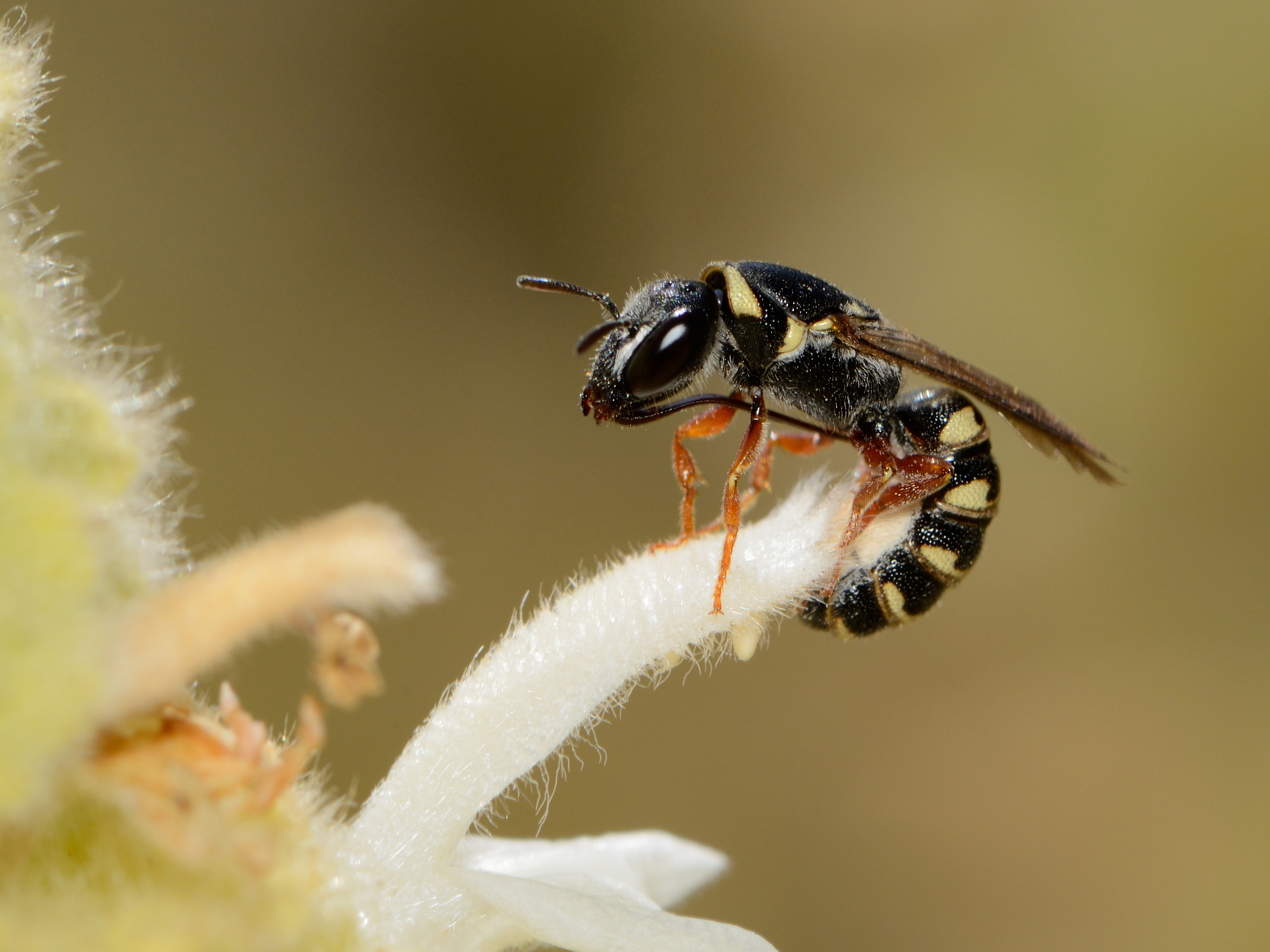
173. Ochreriades fasciata, female
  Ochreriades fasciata (Friese, 1899)
174. Osmia alfkenii Ducke, 1899
175. Osmia amathusica Mavromoustakis, 1937
176. Osmia andrenoides Spinola, 1808
177. Osmia apicata Smith, 1853
178. Osmia aquila Warncke, 1988
179. Osmia avedata Warncke, 1992
180. Osmia bidentata Morawitz, 1876
181. Osmia caerulescens (Linnaeus, 1758)
182. Osmia cephalotes Morawitz, 1870
183. Osmia chrysolepta Haeseler, 2005
184. Osmia cinnabarina Pérez, 1895
185. Osmia clypearis Morawitz, 1871
186. Osmia cyanoxantha Pérez, 1879
187. Osmia difficilis Morawitz, 1875
188. Osmia dilaticornis Morawitz, 1875
189. Osmia dimidiata Morawitz, 1870
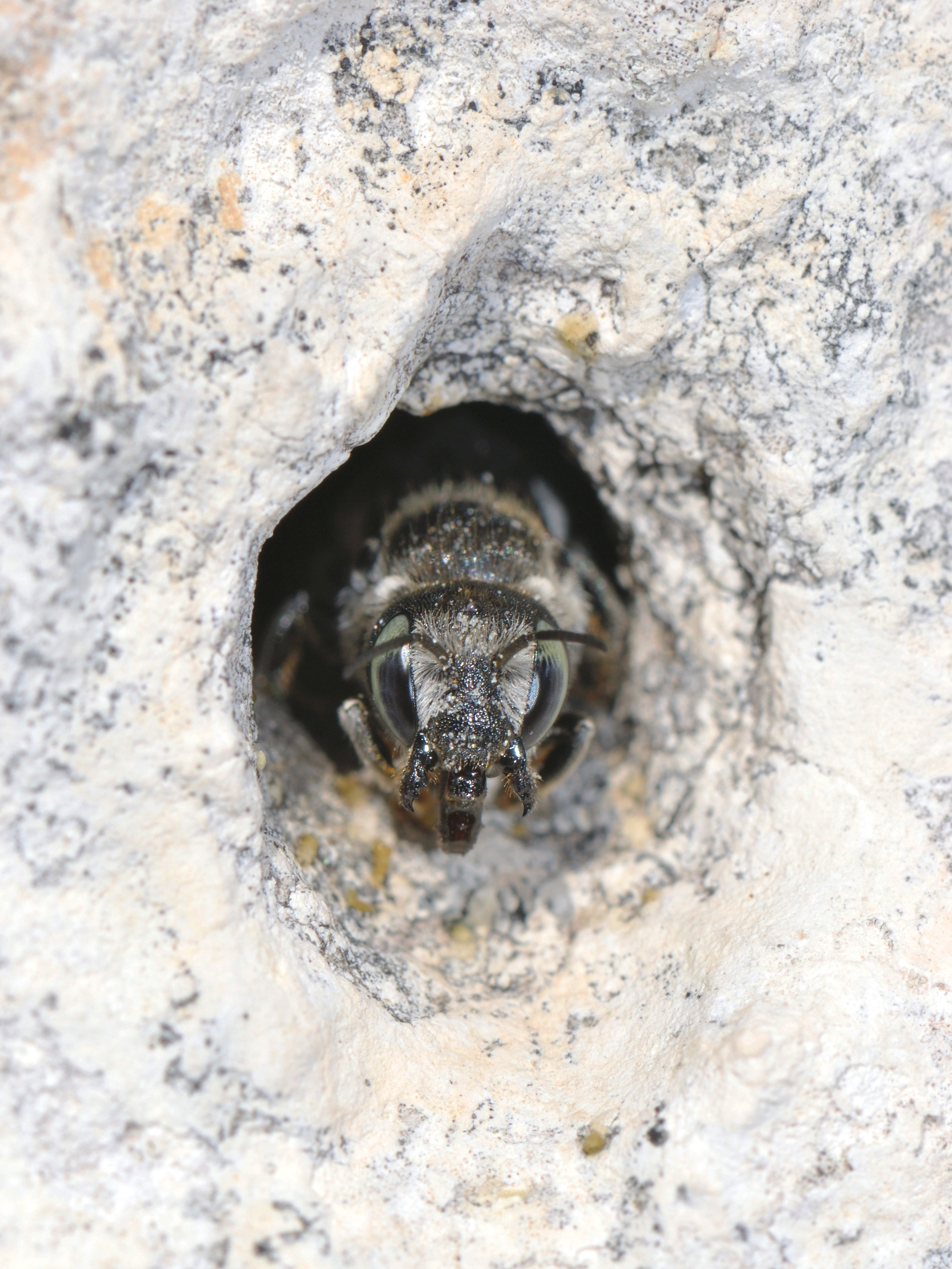
190. Osmia distinguenda, female
  Osmia distinguenda (Tkalcu, 1974)
191. Osmia dives Mocsary, 1877
192. Osmia erythrogastra Ferton, 1905
193. Osmia fasciata Latreille, 1811
194. Osmia ferruginea Latreille, 1811
195. Osmia gemmea Pérez, 1896
196. Osmia gracilicornis Pérez, 1895
197. Osmia gutturalis Warncke, 1988
198. Osmia hellados Zanden, 1984
199. Osmia hermona Warncke, 1992
200. Osmia hermonensis (Tkalcu, 1992)
201. Osmia jason Benoist, 1929
202. Osmia laticella van der Zanden, 1986
203. Osmia latreillei (Spinola, 1806) אוסמיה מקרינה
204. Osmia lazulina Benoist, 1928
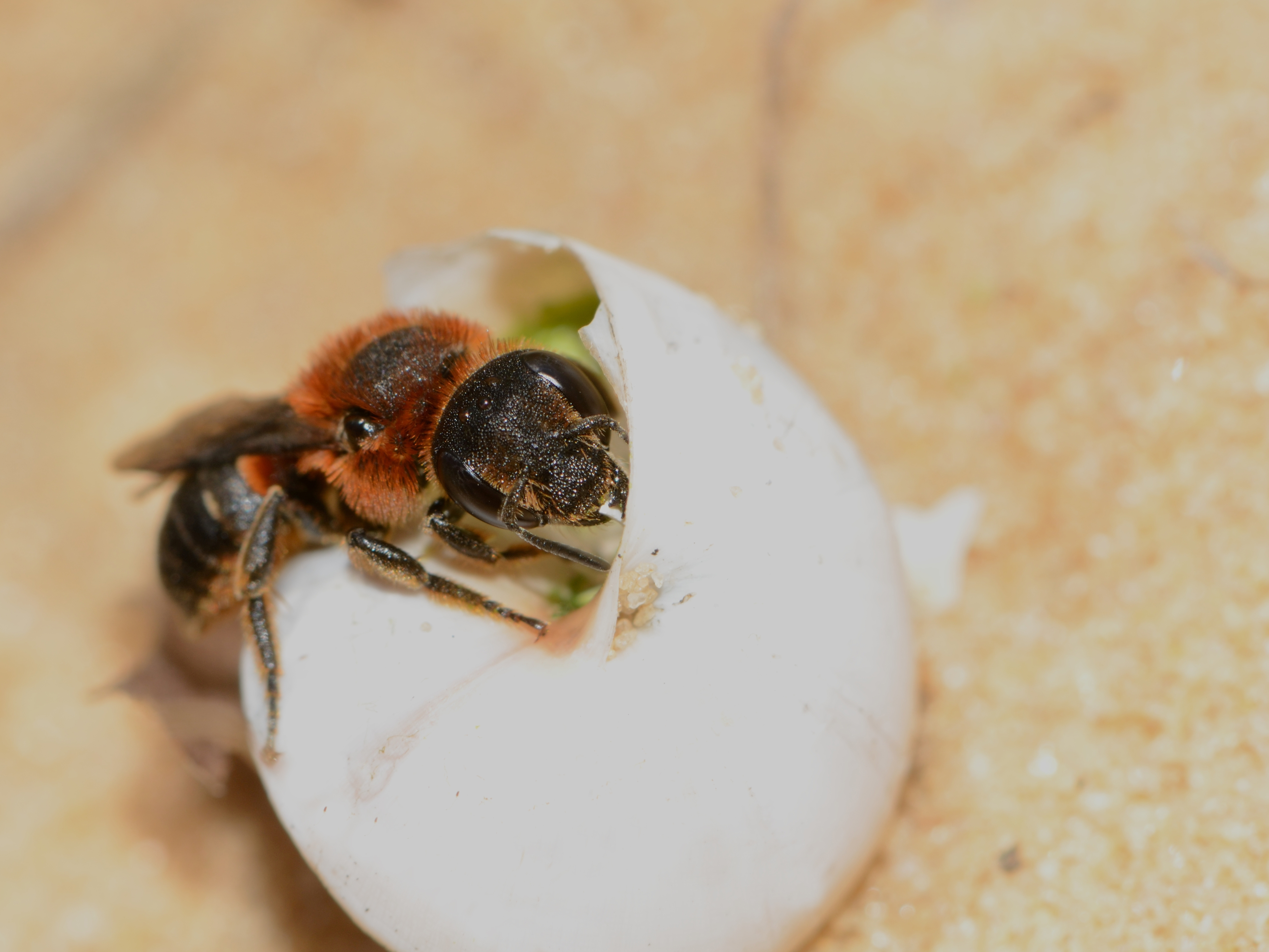
205. Osmia lhotelleriei, female
  Osmia lhotelleriei Pérez, 1887
206. Osmia ligurica Morawitz, 1868
207. Osmia lobata Friese, 1899
208. Osmia melanogaster Spinola, 1808
209. Osmia milenae Tkalcu, 1992
210. Osmia mirhiji Mavromoustakis, 1957
211. Osmia moreensis Zanden, 1984
212. Osmia mustelina Gerstaecker, 1869
213. Osmia nana Morawitz, 1874
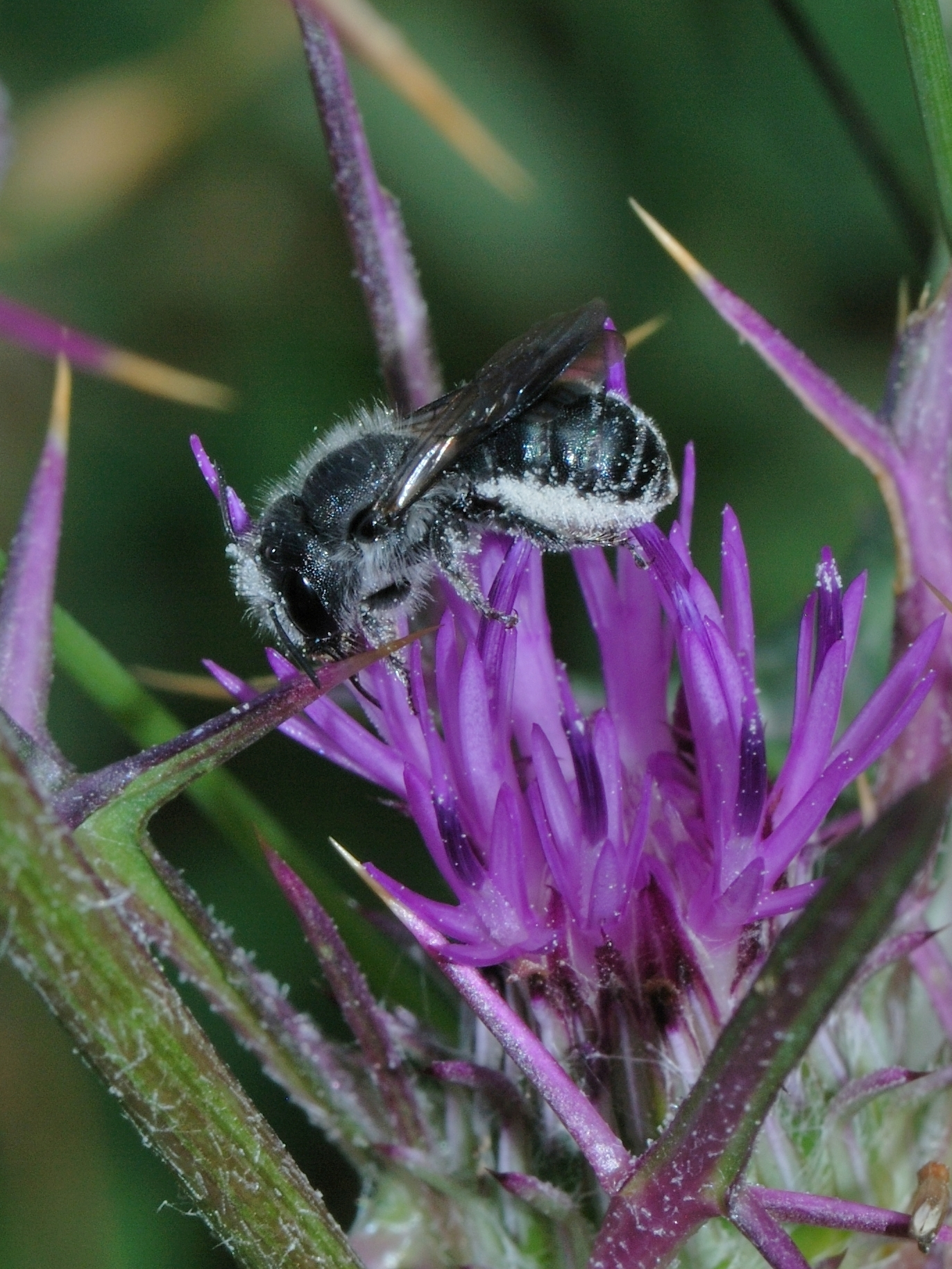
214. Osmia niveata, female
  Osmia niveata (Fabricius, 1804)
215. Osmia notata (Fabricius, 1804)
216. Osmia pennata Warncke, 1988
217. Osmia pinguis Pérez, 1895
218. Osmia ramona Warncke, 1992
219. Osmia rhodoensis (Zanden, 1983)
220. Osmia rufa (Linnaeus, 1758)
221. Osmia rufohirta Latreille, 1811
222. Osmia rufotibialis Friese, 1920
223. Osmia saxatilis Warncke, 1988
224. Osmia saxicola Ducke, 1899
225. Osmia scutellaris Morawitz, 1868
226. Osmia signata Erichson, 1835
227. Osmia sogdiana Morawitz, 1875
228. Osmia spinigera Latreille, 1811
229. Osmia subcornuta Morawitz, 1875
230. Osmia submicans Morawitz, 1870
231. Osmia sybarita Smith, 1853
232. Osmia teunisseni van der Zanden, 1981
233. Osmia versicolor Latreille, 1811
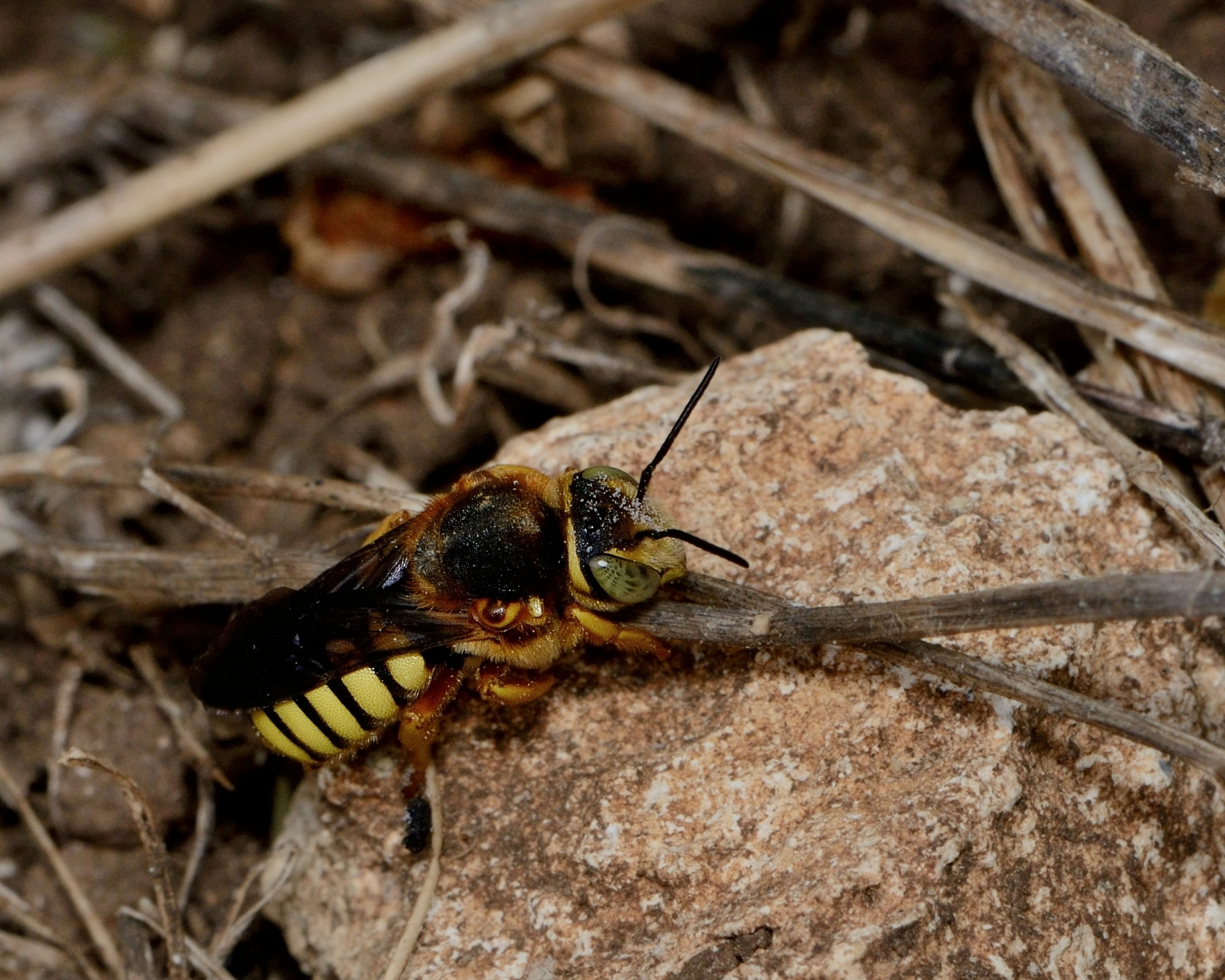
234. Rhodanthidium septemdentatum, male
  Osmia viridana Morawitz, 1874
235. Paradioxys pannonica (Mocsáry, 1877)
236. Prodioxys carnea (Gribodo, 1894)
237. Protosmia humeralis (Pérez, 1895)
238. Protosmia judaica (Mavromoustakis, 1948)
239. Protosmia longiceps (Friese, 1899)
240. Protosmia mirabilis (Pérez, 1895)
241. Protosmia paradoxa (Friese, 1899)
242. Protosmia pulex (Benoist, 1935)
243. Protosmia tiflensis (Morawitz, 1876)
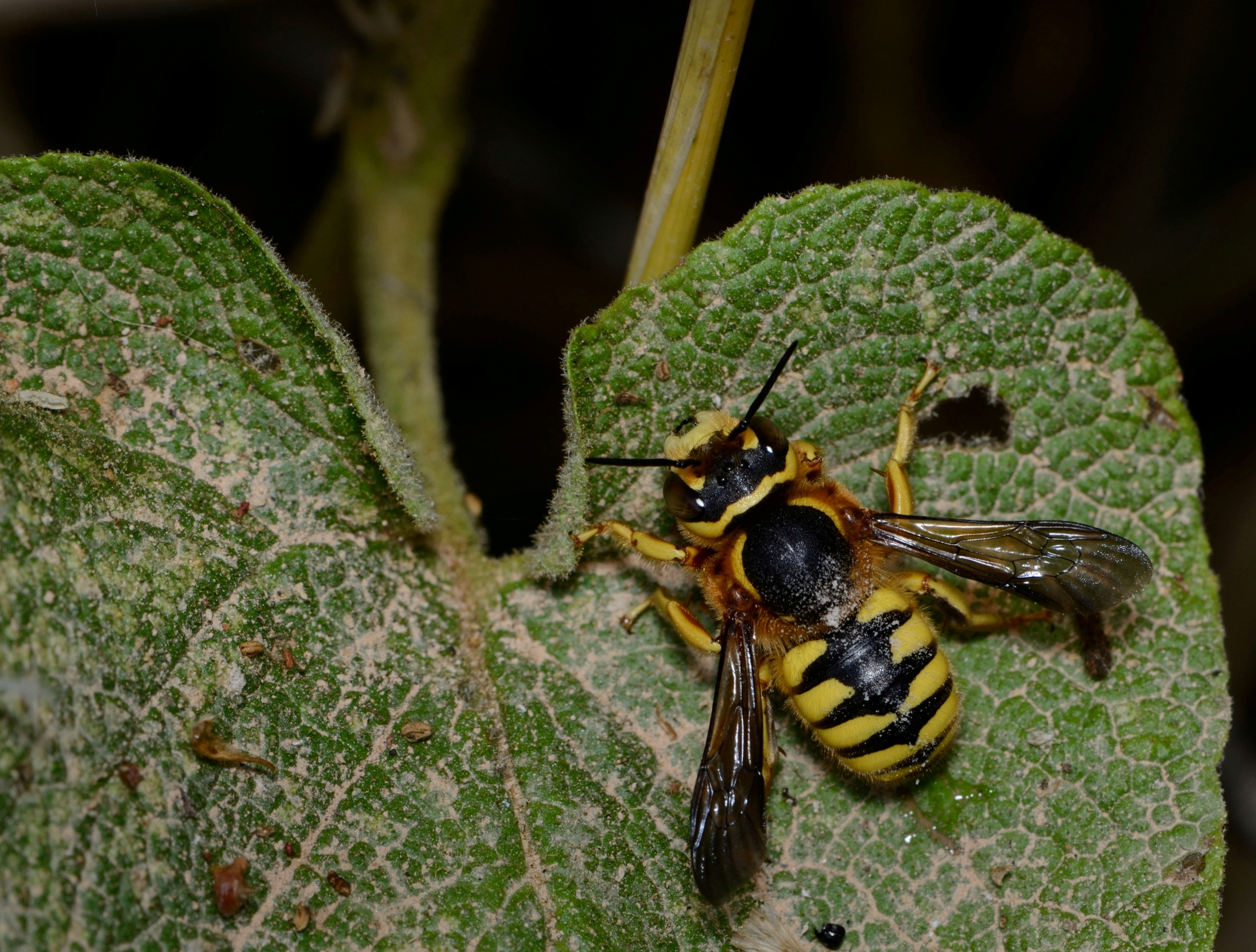
244. Trachusa pubescens, male
  Pseudoanthidium bytinskii (Mavromoustakis, 1948)
245. Pseudoanthidium cribratum (Morawitz, 1875)
246. Pseudoanthidium melanurum (Klug 1832)
247. Pseudoanthidium ochrognathum (Alfken, 1932)
248. Pseudoanthidium rhombiferum (Friese, 1917)
249. Pseudoanthidium wahrmannicum (Mavromoustakis 1933)
250. Pseudoheriades moricei (Friese, 1897)
251. Rhodanthidium jerusalemicum (Mavromoustakis, 1938)
252. Rhodanthidium septemdentatum (Latreille, 1809)
253. Stelis aegyptiaca (Radoszkowsky 1876)
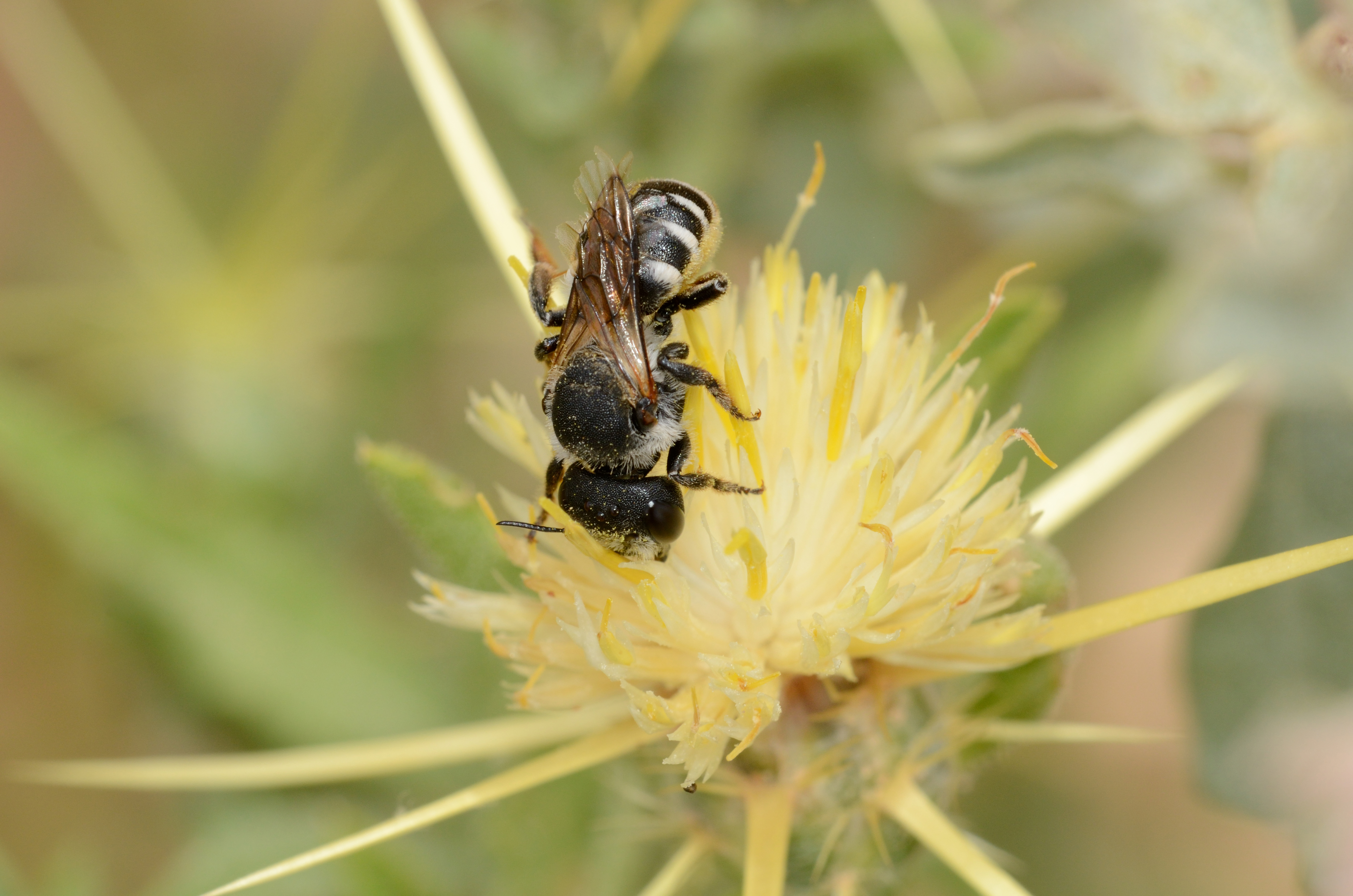
254. Wainia eremoplana, female
  Stelis nasuta (Latreille 1809)
255. Stelis pentelica Mavromoustakis 1963
256. Stelis phaeoptera (Kirby 1802)
257. Stelis signata (Latreille 1809)
258. Stenoheriades asiaticus (Friese, 1921)
259. Stenoheriades eingeddicus Griswold, 1994
260. Stenoheriades levantica Müller, 2014
261. Trachusa pubescens Morawitz 1872
262. Wainia eremoplana (Mavromoustakis, 1949)

=== Apidae ===
1. Amegilla albigena (Lepeletier, 1841)
2. Amegilla lutulenta (Klug, 1845)
3. Amegilla mucorea (Klug, 1845)
4. Amegilla quadrifasciata (de Villers, 1789)
5. Ammobates armeniacus Morawitz 1876
6. Ammobates atrorufus (Warncke 1983)
7. Ammobates biastoides Friese 1895
8. Ammobates dubius Benoist, 1961
9. Ammobates latitarsis (Friese 1899)
10. Ammobates mavromoustakisi Popov, 1944
11. Ammobates minutissimus Mavromoustakis, 1959
12. Ammobates niveatus (Spinola, 1838)
13. Ammobates oraniensis (Lepeletier, 1841)
14. Ammobates robustus Friese, 1896
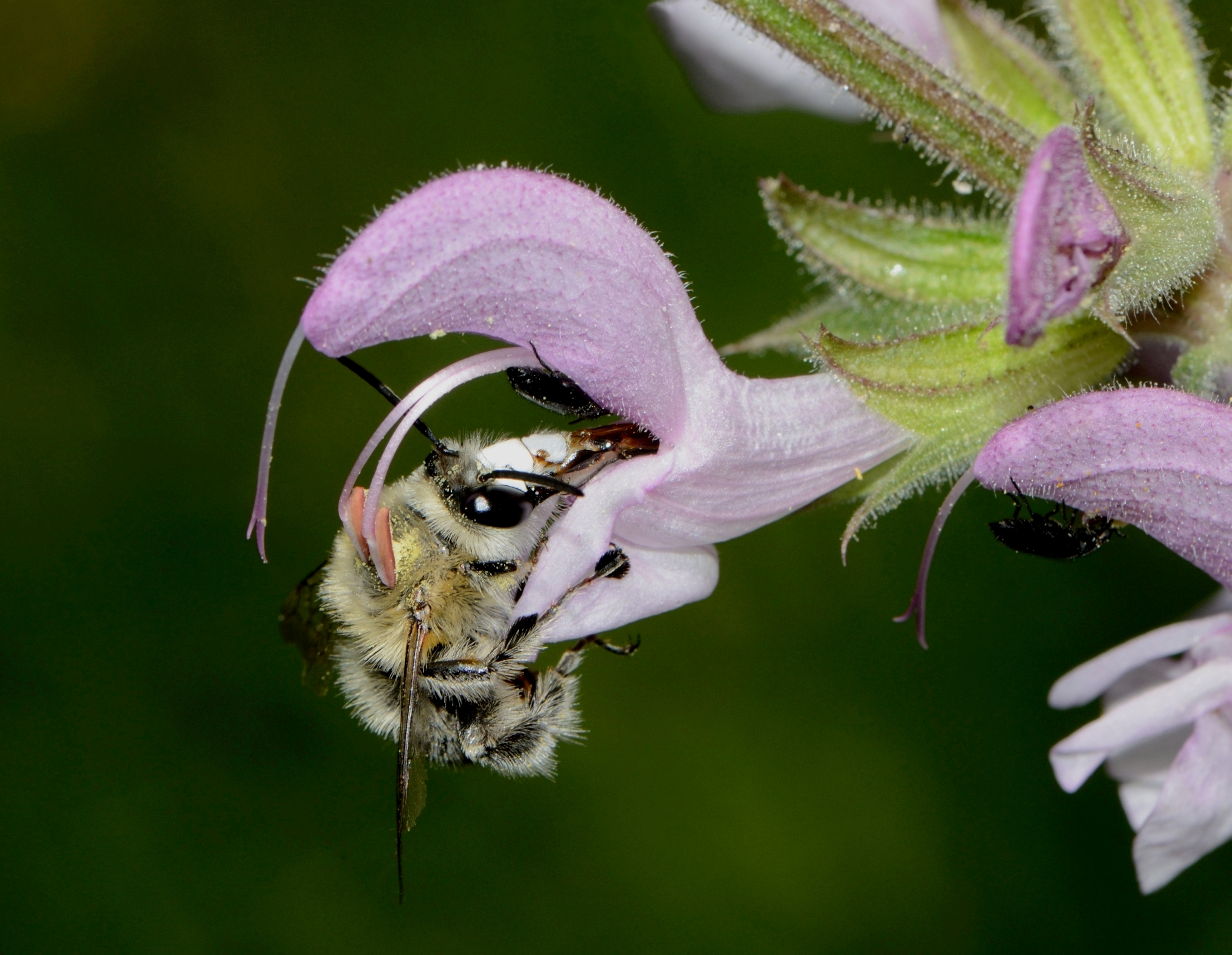
15. Anthophora dufourii, male
  Ammobates syriacus Friese, 1899
16. Ancyla asiatica Friese 1922
17. Ancyla orientalica Warncke, 1979
18. Anthophora aegyptiaca (Dalla Torre and Friese, 1895)
19. Anthophora aestivalis (Panzer, 1801)
20. Anthophora agama Radoszkowski, 1869
21. Anthophora ambitiosa Alfken, 1935
22. Anthophora arabica Priesner, 1957
23. Anthophora atriceps Pérez, 1879
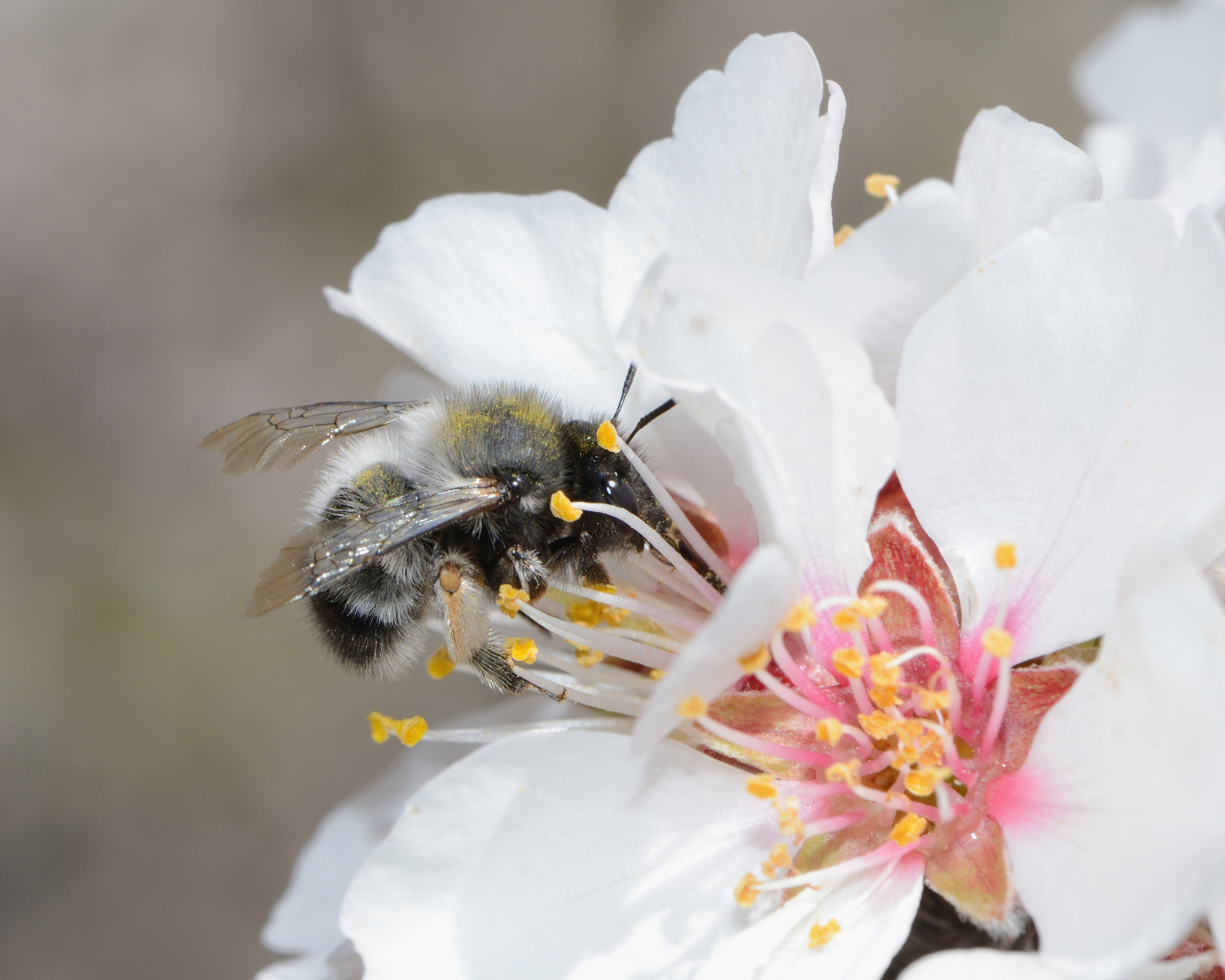
24. Anthophora nigriceps, female
  Anthophora biciliata Lepeletier, 1841
25. Anthophora blanda Pérez, 1895
26. Anthophora caelebs Gribodo, 1924
27. Anthophora canescens Brullé, 1832
28. Anthophora caroli Pérez, 1895
29. Anthophora cinerascens Lepeletier, 1841
30. Anthophora crassipes Lepeletier 1841
31. Anthophora crinipes Smith, 1854
32. Anthophora deserticola Morawitz 1873
33. Anthophora dispar Lepeletier, 1841
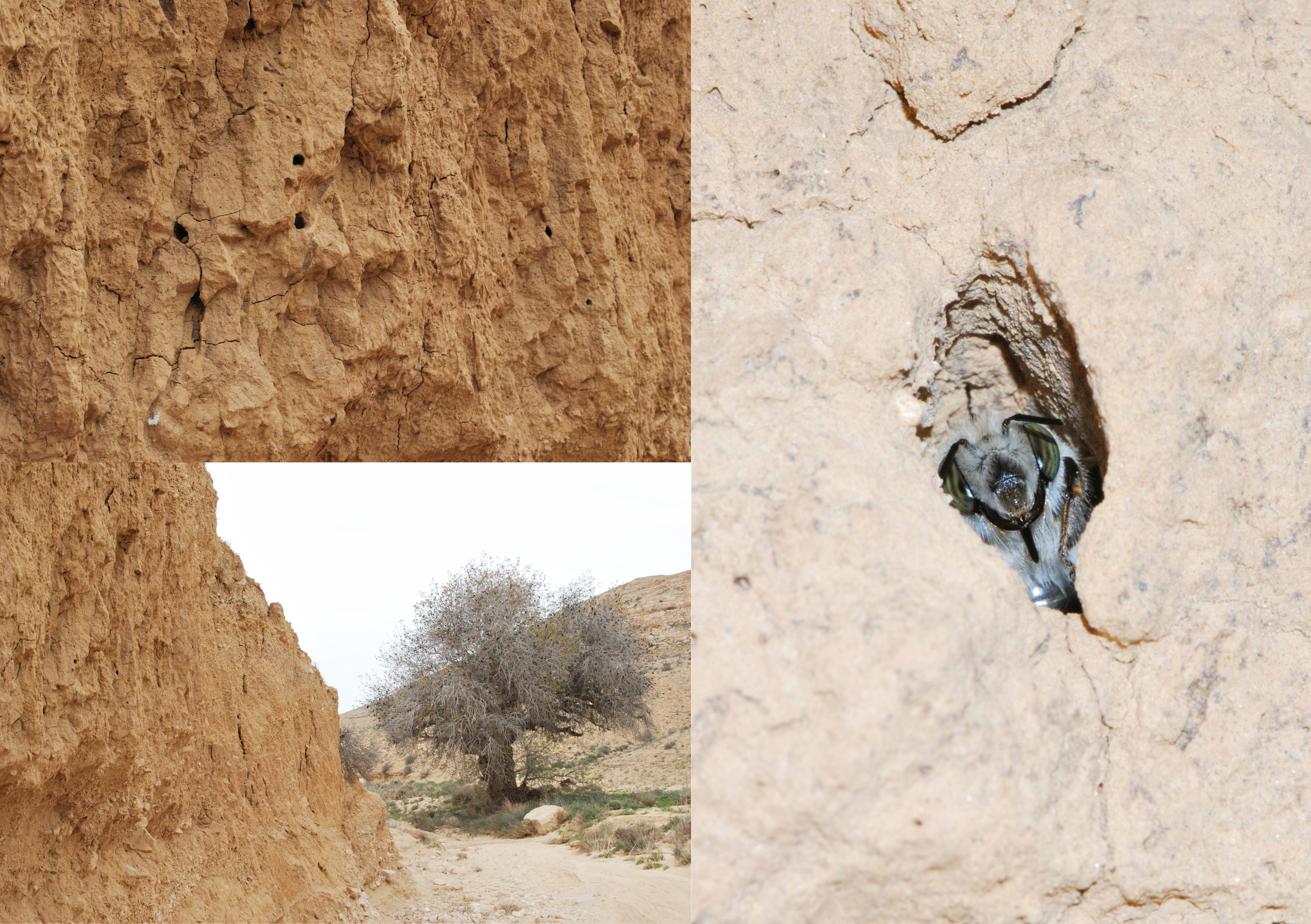
34. Anthophora senescens, female
  Anthophora disparilis Friese 1922
35. Anthophora dufourii Lepeletier 1841
36. Anthophora erschowi Fedtschenko 1875
37. Anthophora erubescens Morawitz 1880
38. Anthophora extricata Priesner, 1957
39. Anthophora flabellata Priesner, 1957
40. Anthophora fulvitarsis Brulle, 1832 מדרונית צהובת-רגל
41. Anthophora heliopolitensis Pérez 1910
42. Anthophora hispanica (Fabricius 1787)
43. Anthophora libyphaenica Gribodo 1893
44. Anthophora muscaria Fedtschenko 1875
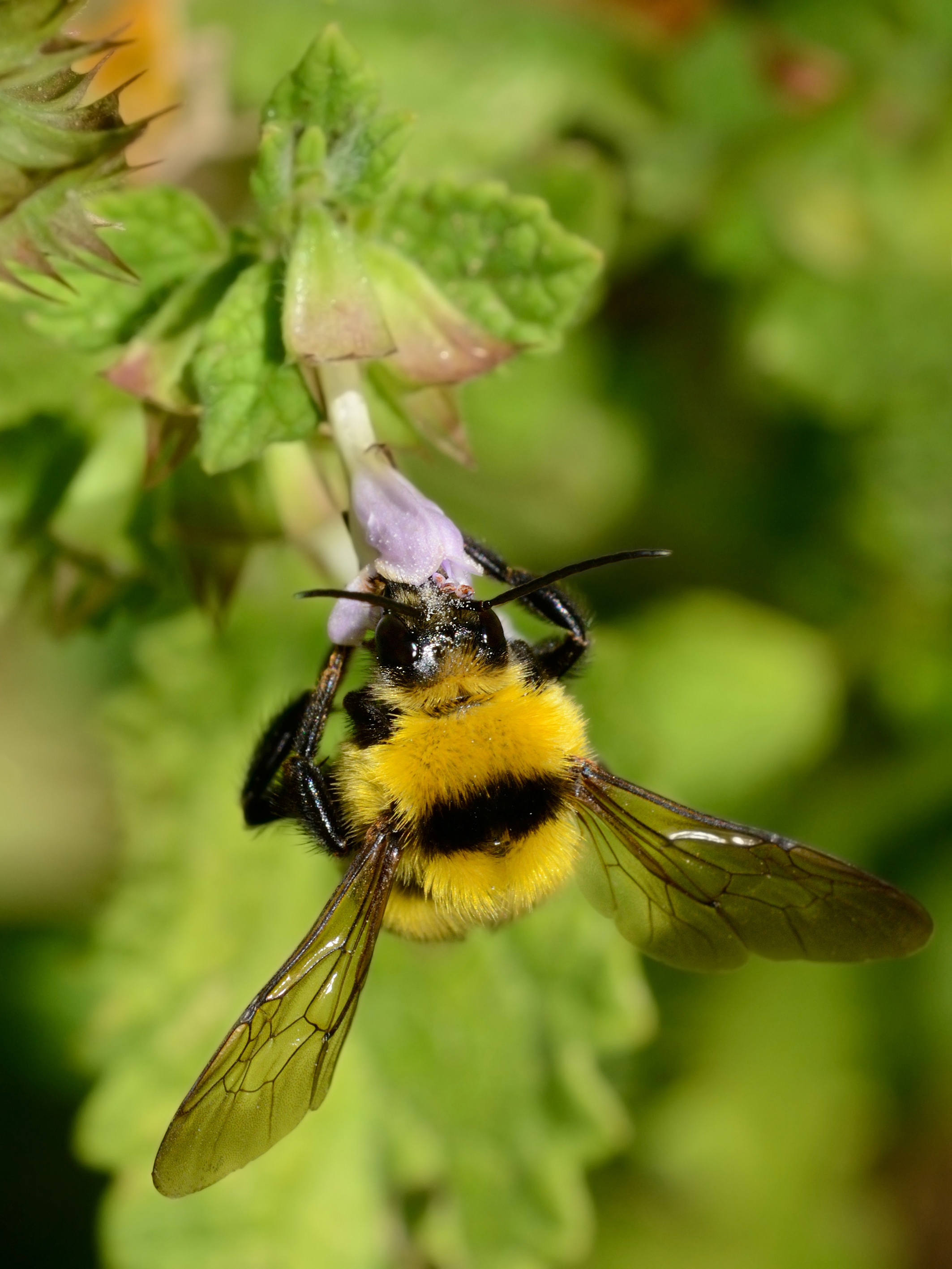
45. Bombus argillaceus, male
  Anthophora nigriceps Morawitz, 1886
46. Anthophora orientalis Morawitz 1878
47. Anthophora plumipes (Pallas, 1772) מדרונית ארוכת-פיסה
48. Anthophora ponomarevae Brooks 1988
49. Anthophora priesneri Alfken 1932
50. Anthophora pubescens Fabricius 1871
51. Anthophora richaensis Alfken 1938
52. Anthophora robusta (Klug 1845)
53. Anthophora rogenhoferi Morawitz 1872
54. Anthophora romandii Lepeletier 1841
55. Anthophora rubricrus Dours, 1873
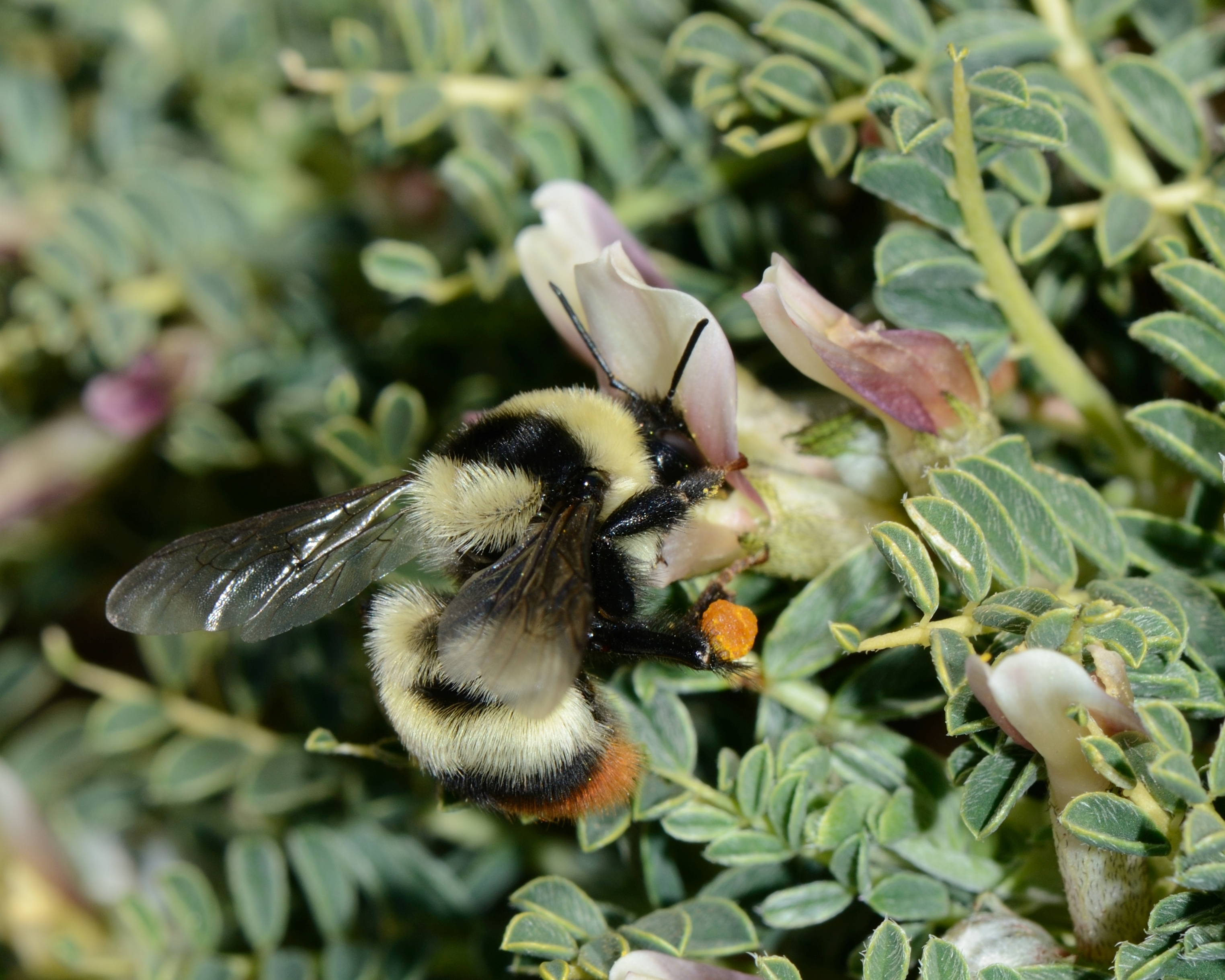
56. Bombus niveatus, female
  Anthophora rutilans Dours 1869
57. Anthophora scopipes Spinola, 1838
58. Anthophora semirufa (Friese 1898)
59. Anthophora senescens Lepeletier 1841
60. Anthophora sergia (Nurse, 1904)
61. Anthophora spinacoxa Brooks, 1988
62. Anthophora tarsalis Priesner 1957
63. Anthophora vernalis Morawitz 1878
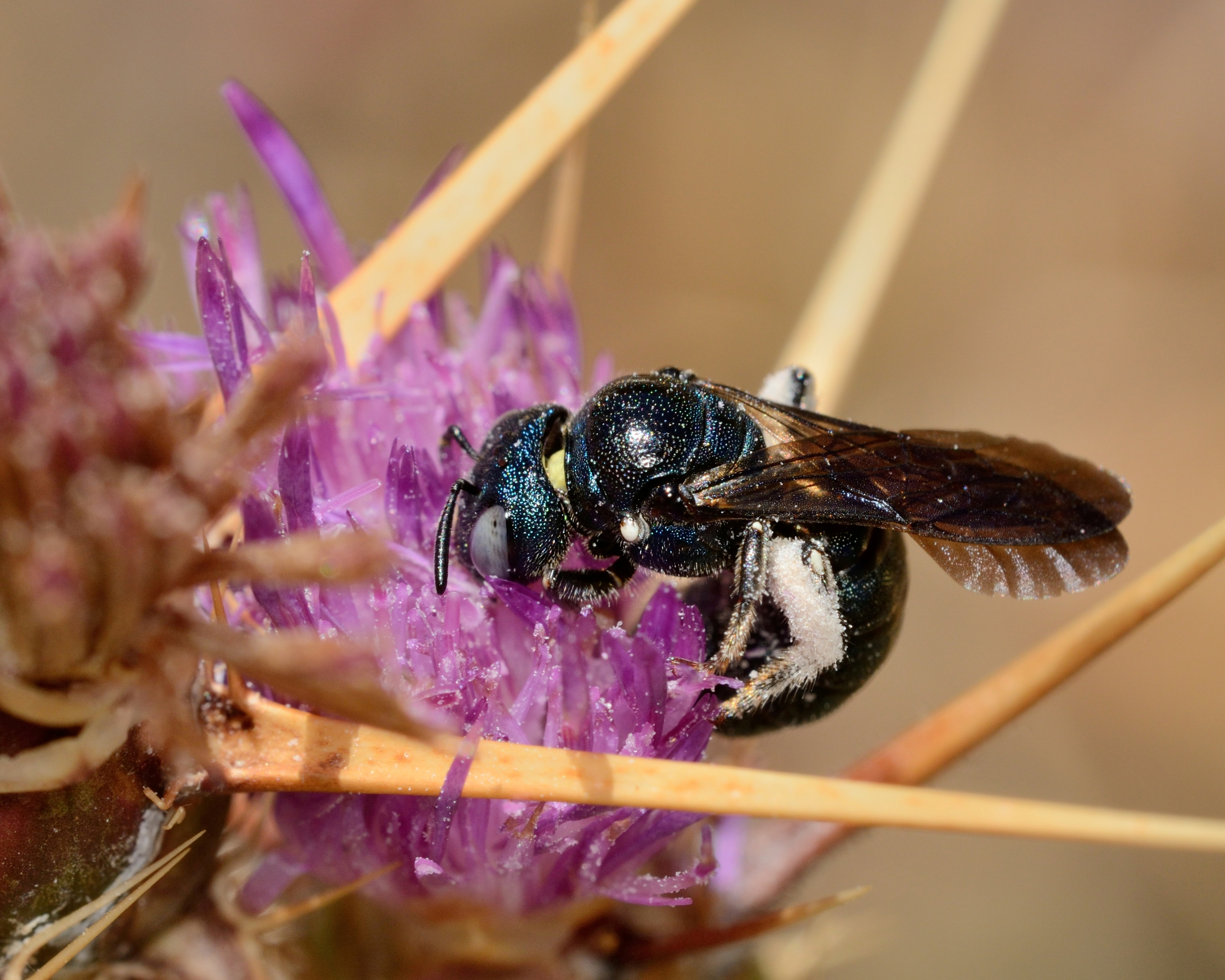
64. Ceratina chalcites, female
  Anthophora vidua (Klug, 1845)
65. Anthophora wegelini Friese 1914
66. Apis mellifera syriaca Skorikov, 1829 דבורה סורית
67. Bombus argillaceus (Scopoli, 1763) בומבוס ארך-ראש
68. Bombus niveatus (Kriechbaumer, 1870) בומבוס החרמון
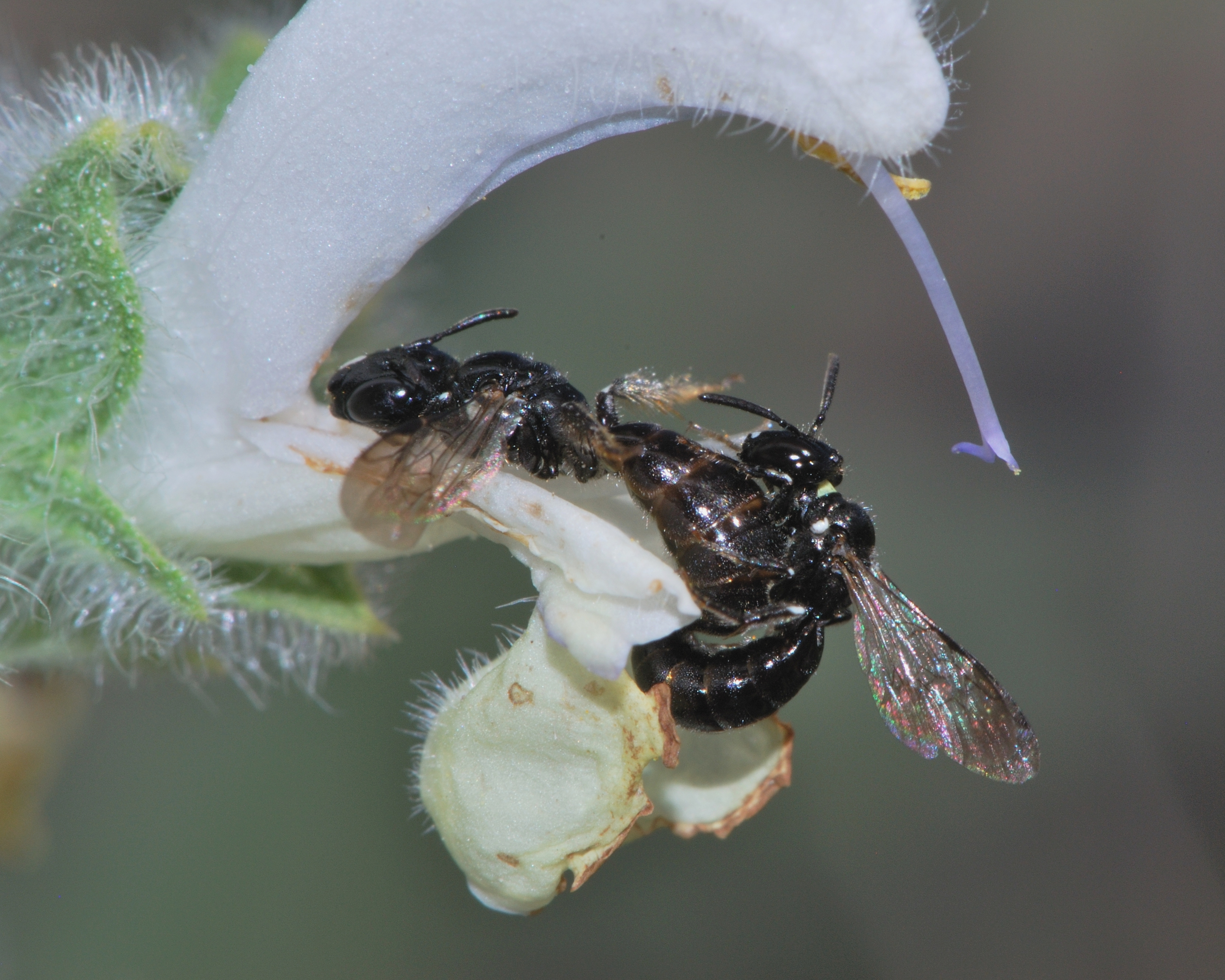
69. Ceratina cucurbitina, copulation
  Bombus terrestris (Linnaeus, 1758) בומבוס האדמה
70. Ceratina acuta Friese, 1896
71. Ceratina bifida Friese, 1900
72. Ceratina bispinosa Handlirsch, 1889
73. Ceratina chalcites Germar, 1839 צרטינה ענקית
74. Ceratina cucurbitina (Rossi, 1792)
75. Ceratina dallatorreana Friese, 1896
76. Ceratina dentiventris Gerstäcker, 1869
77. Ceratina loewi Gerstacker, 1869
78. Ceratina mandibularis Friese, 1896
79. Ceratina moricei Friese, 1899
80. Ceratina nigroaenea Gerstacker, 1869
81. Ceratina nigrolabiata Friese, 1896
82. Ceratina parvula Smith, 1854 צרטינה ננסית
83. Ceratina schwarzi Kocourek, 1998
84. Ceratina tarsata Morawitz, 1871
85. Ceratina tibialis Morawitz, 1895
86. Ceratina zandeni Terzo, 1998
87. Chiasmognathus aegyptiacus (Warncke 1983)
88. Chiasmognathus orientanus (Warncke, 1983)
89. Cubitalia baal Engel, 2006
90. Cubitalia boyadjiani (Vachal, 1907)
91. Epeolus bischoffi (Mavromoustakis, 1954)
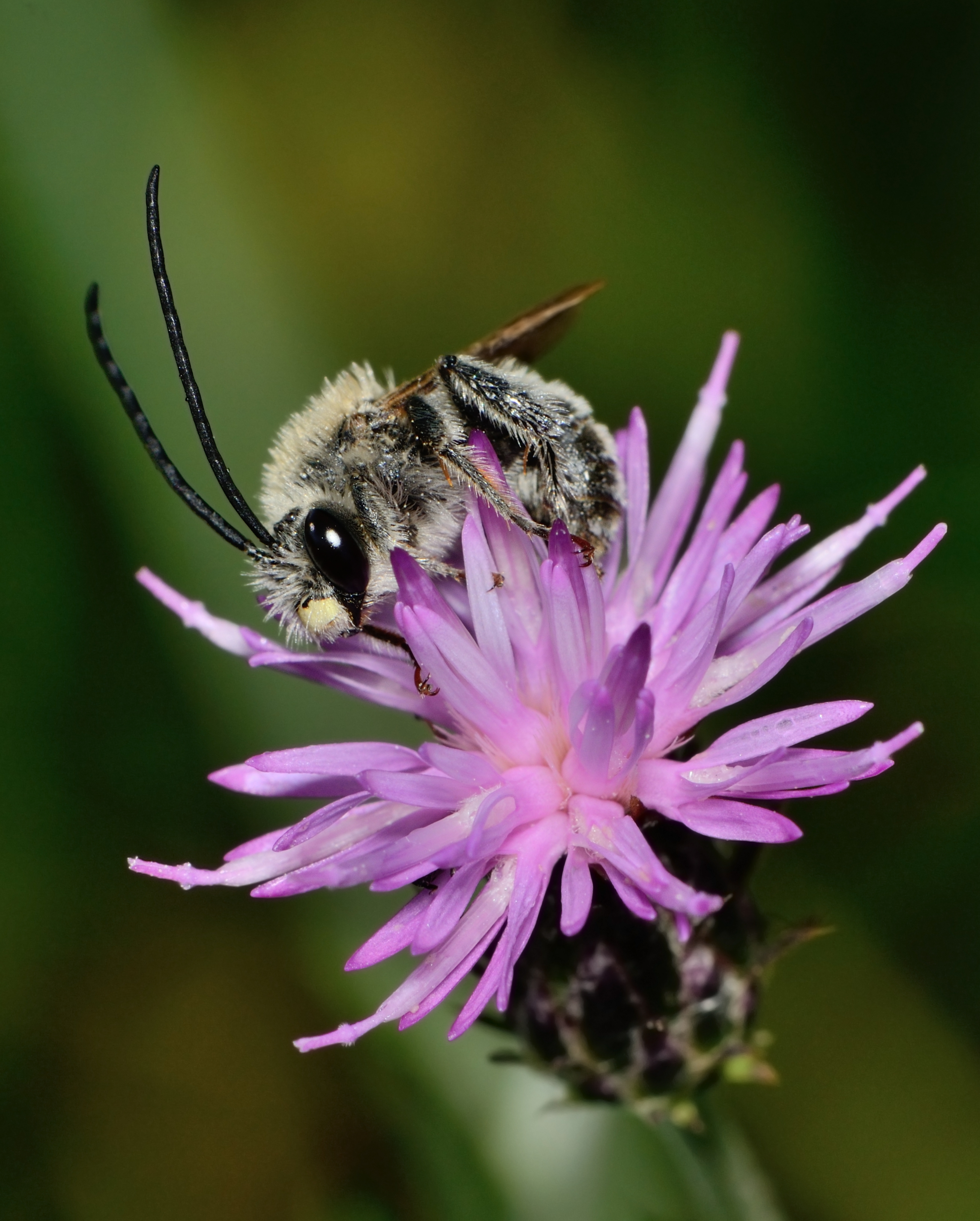
92. Eucera cinnamomea, male
  Epeolus flavociliatus Friese, 1899
93. Eucera aeolopus Pérez, 1908
94. Eucera aequata Vachal, 1907
95. Eucera alfkeni Risch, 2003
96. Eucera alternans (Brullé, 1832)
97. Eucera bidentata Pérez, 1887
98. Eucera biscrensis (Alfken, 1933)
99. Eucera caerulescens Friese, 1899
100. Eucera cinnamomea Alfken, 1935
101. Eucera clypeata Erichson, 1835
102. Eucera commixta Dalla Torre & Friese, 1895
103. Eucera cuniculina Klug, 1845
104. Eucera curvitarsis Mocsary, 1879
105. Eucera dalmatica Lepeletier, 1841
106. Eucera decipiens Alfken, 1935
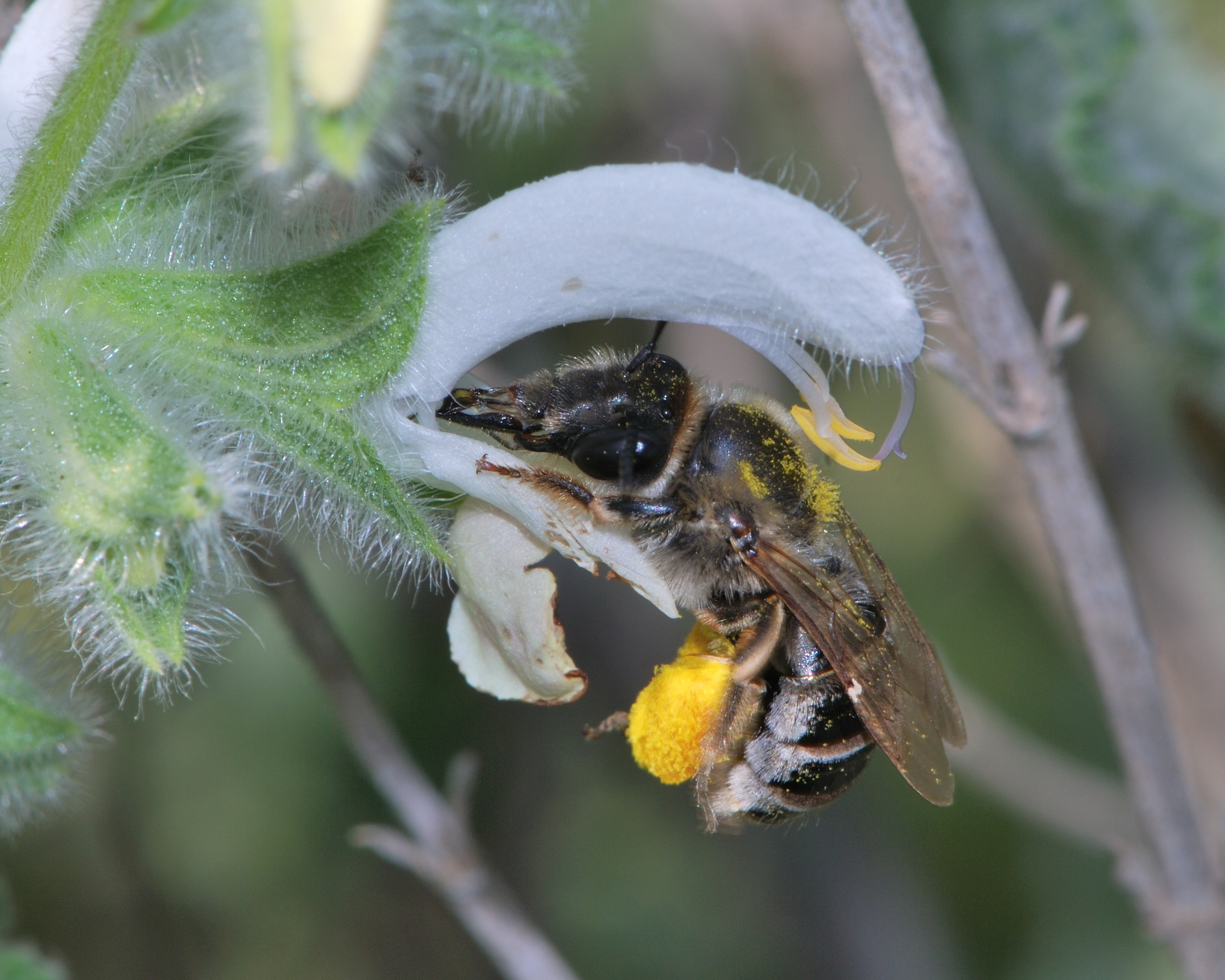
107. Eucera kullenbergi, female
  Eucera ebmeri Risch, 1999
108. Eucera friesei Risch, 2003
109. Eucera furfurea Vachal, 1907
110. Eucera gaullei Vachal, 1907
111. Eucera graeca Radoszkowski, 1876
112. Eucera helvola Klug, 1845
113. Eucera hermoni Risch, 2003
114. Eucera hungarica Friese, 1896
115. Eucera kilikiae Risch, 1999
116. Eucera kullenbergi Tkalců, 1978
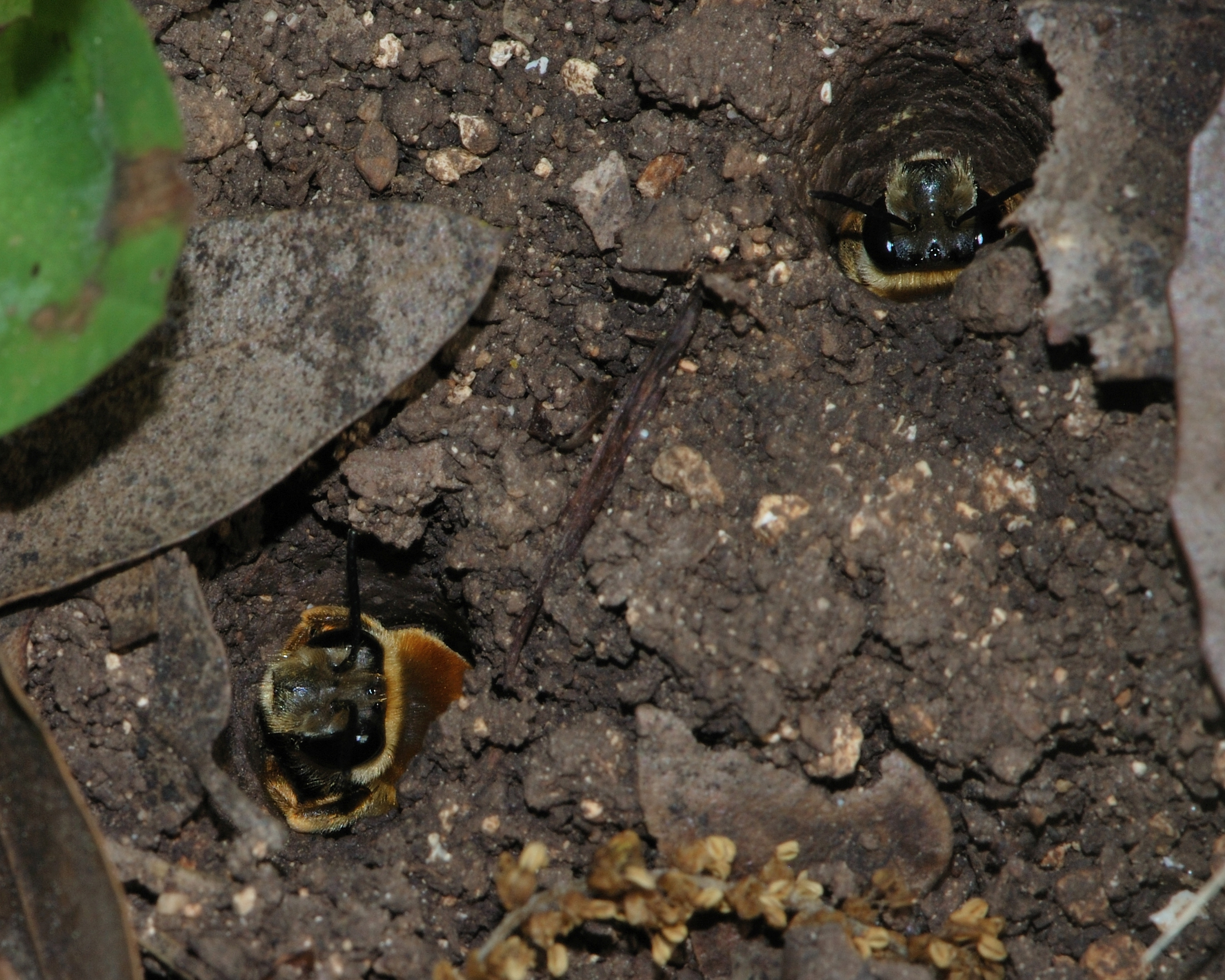
117. Eucera plumigera, females
  Eucera laxiscopa Alfken, 1935
118. Eucera maxima Tkalců, 1987
119. Eucera mediterranea Friese, 1896
120. Eucera microsoma Cockerell, 1922
121. Eucera minulla Risch, 2003
122. Eucera nigrifacies Lepeletier, 1841
123. Eucera nigrilabris Lepeletier, 1841
124. Eucera nigrita Friese, 1896
125. Eucera palaestinae Friese, 1922 מחושית ישראלית
126. Eucera paraclypeata Sitdikov, 1988
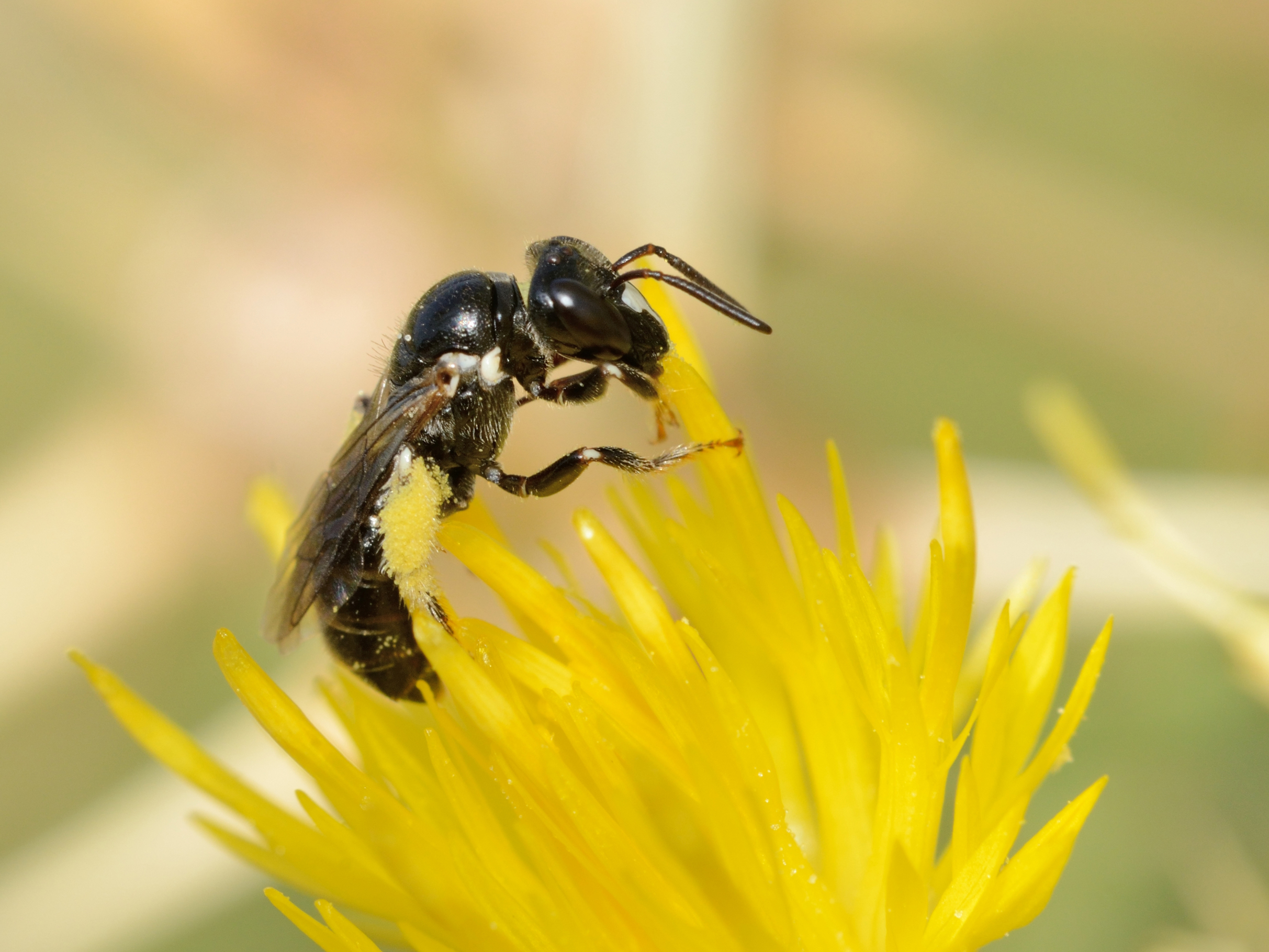
127. Exoneuridia libanensis, female
  Eucera parnassia Pérez, 1902
128. Eucera penicillata Risch, 1997
129. Eucera pici Vachal, 1907
130. Eucera plumigera Kohl, 1905
131. Eucera pseudeucnemidea Risch, 1997
132. Eucera speculifer Pérez, 1911
133. Eucera spectabilis (Morawitz, 1875)
134. Eucera spinipes Risch, 2003
135. Eucera squamosa Lepeletier, 1841
136. Eucera sulamita Vachal, 1907
137. Eucera syriaca Dalla Torre, 1896
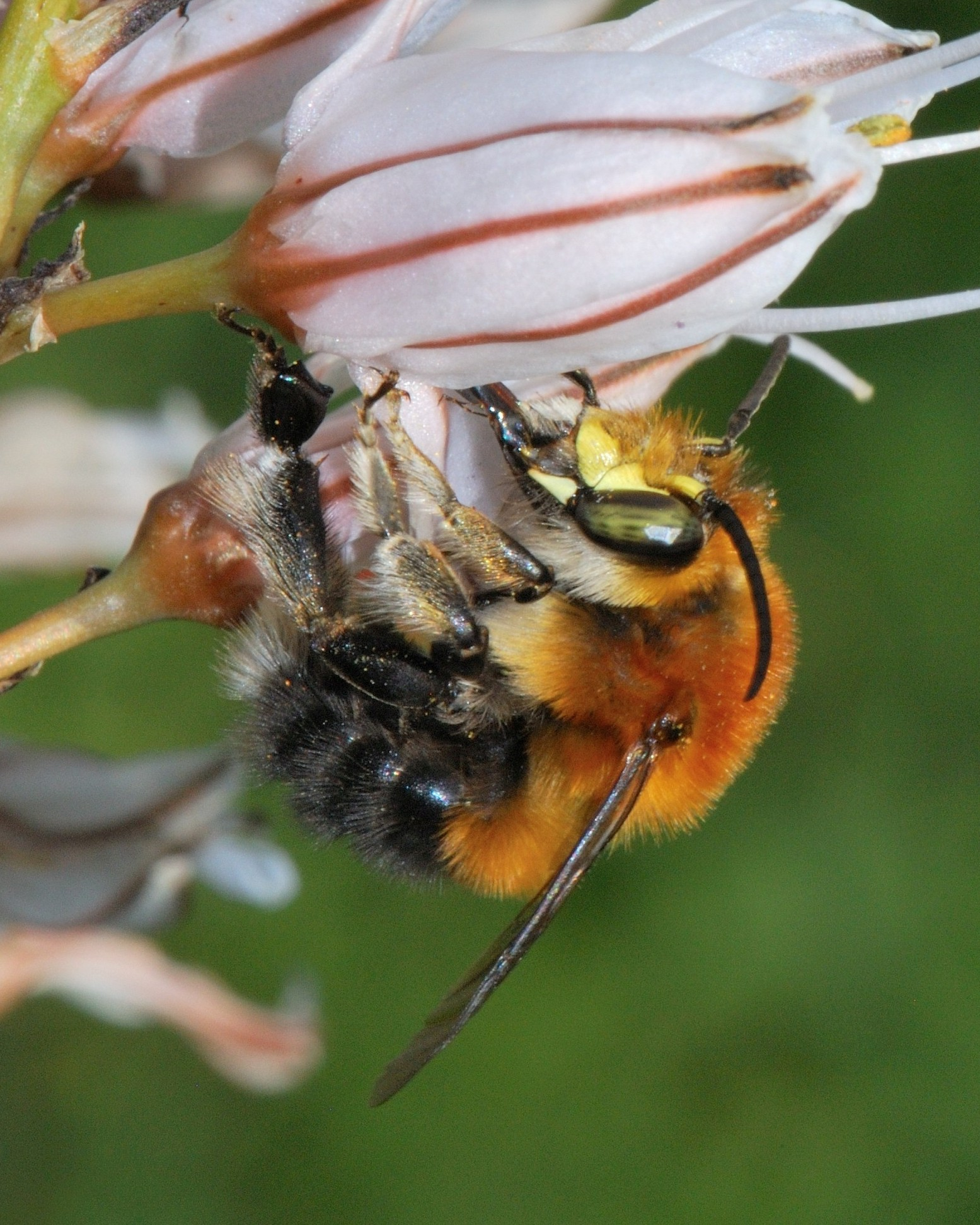
138. Habropoda tarsata, male
  Eucera tricincta Erichson, 1835
139. Eucera troglodytes Risch, 2003
140. Eucera velutina (Morawitz, 1873)
141. Eucera vulpes Brullé, 1832
142. Exoneuridia libanensis (Friese 1899)
143. Habropoda tarsata (Spinola, 1838)
144. Melecta aegyptiaca Radoszkowski, 1876
145. Melecta albifrons (Forster, 1771)
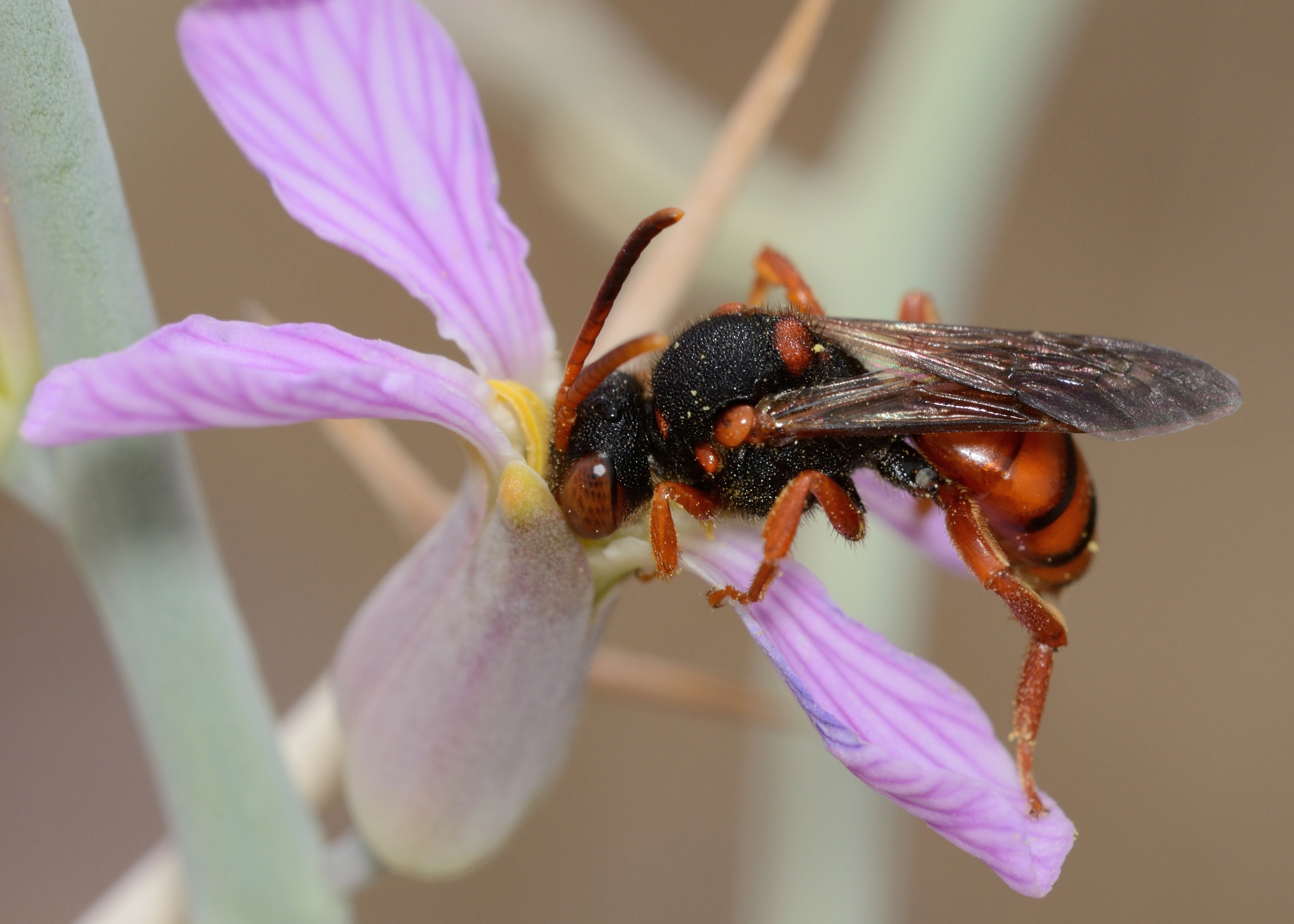
146. Nomada bifasciata, female
  Melecta angustilabris (Lieftinck, 1980)
147. Melecta diligens Lieftinck, 1983
148. Melecta festiva Lieftinck, 1980
149. Melecta fulgida Lieftinck, 1980
150. Melecta grandis Lepeletier, 1841
151. Melecta honesta Lieftinck, 1980
152. Melecta italica Radoszkowski, 1876
153. Melecta leucorhyncha Gribodo, 1893
154. Melecta sinaitica (Alfken, 1937)
155. Melecta tuberculata Lieftinck, 1980
156. Nomada agrestis Fabricius, 1787
157. Nomada basalis Herrich-Schäffer, 1839
158. Nomada braunsiana Schmiedeknecht, 1882
159. Nomada caspia Morawitz, 1895
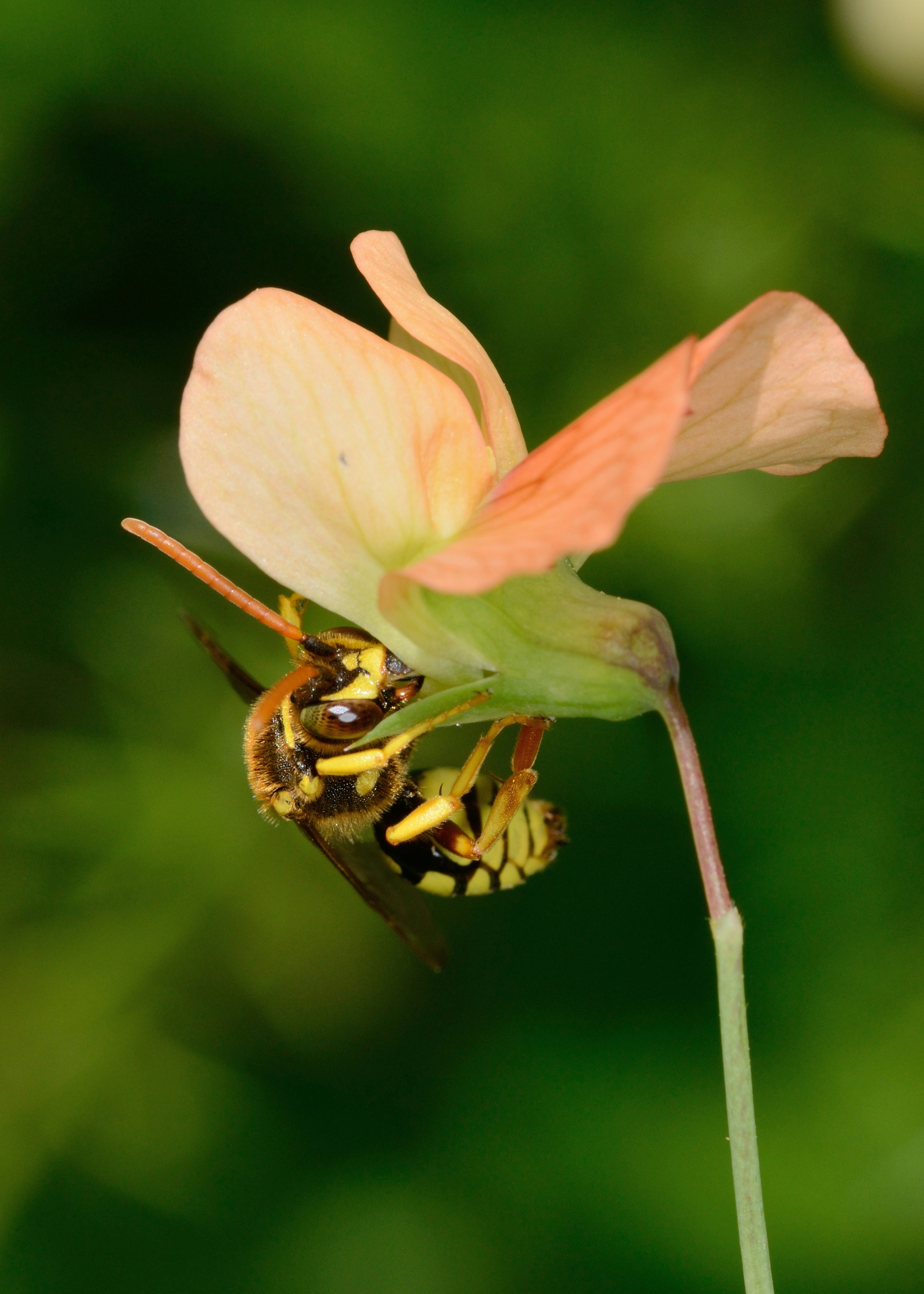
160. Nomada limassolica, female
  Nomada cherkesiana Mavromoustakis, 1955
161. Nomada cleopatra Schwarz, 1989
162. Nomada confinis Schmiedeknecht, 1882
163. Nomada coxalis Morawitz 1877
164. Nomada curvispinosa Schwarz, 1981
165. Nomada eos Schmiedeknecht, 1882
166. Nomada femoralis Morawitz, 1869
167. Nomada fenestrata Lepeletier 1841
168. Nomada flavinervis Brullé, 1832
169. Nomada flavoguttata (Kirby, 1802)
170. Nomada fucata Panzer, 1798
171. Nomada gracilicornis Morawitz 1895
172. Nomada guichardi Schwarz, 1981
173. Nomada guttulata Schenck, 1861
174. Nomada hera Schwarz, 1965
175. Nomada insignipes Schmiedeknecht, 1882
176. Nomada integra Brullé 1832
177. Nomada kervilleana Pérez, 1913
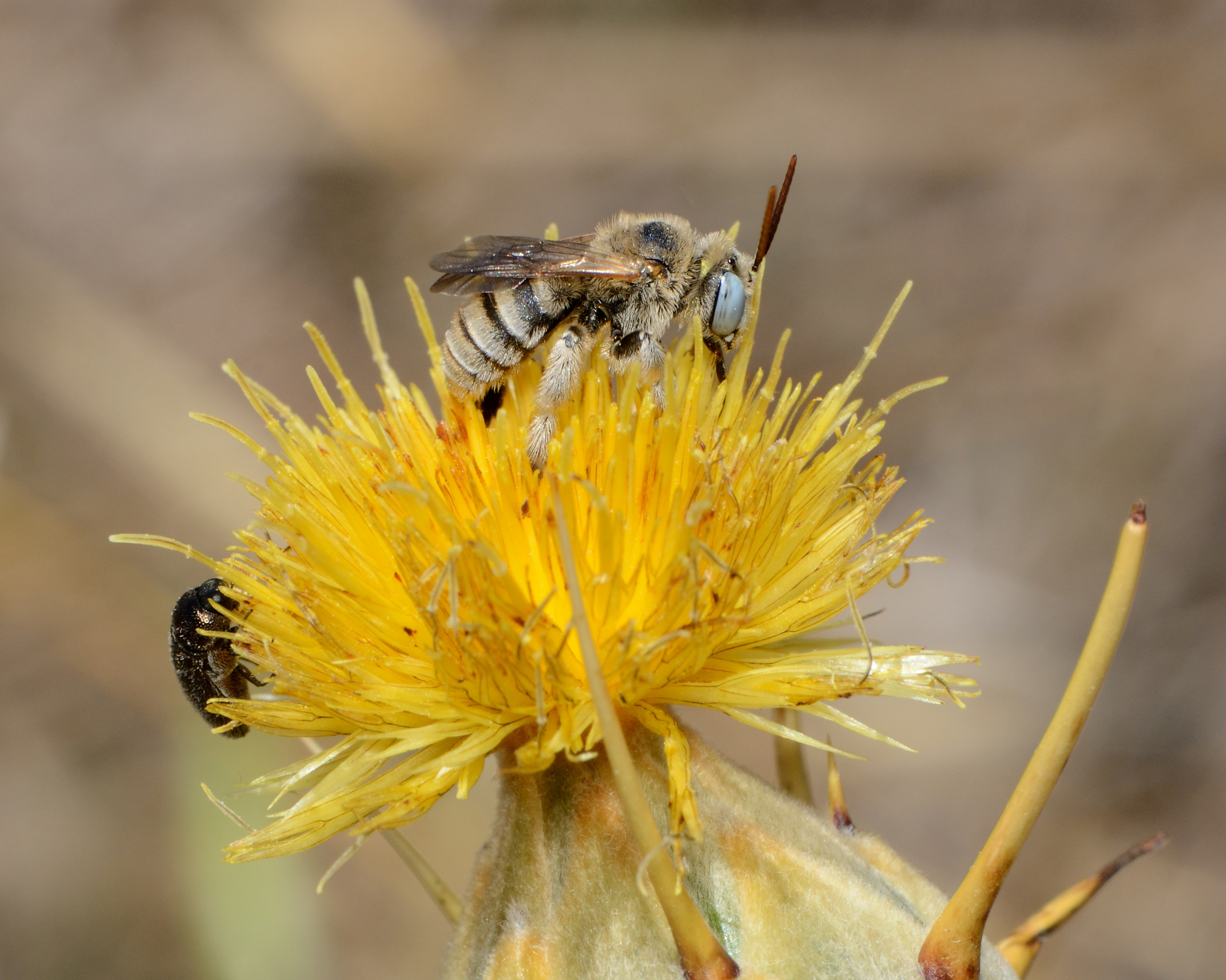
178. Tarsalia ancyliformis, male
  Nomada kohli Schmiedeknecht, 1882
179. Nomada kusdasi Schwarz, 1981
180. Nomada lateritia Mocsáry, 1883
181. Nomada lucidula Schwarz 1967
182. Nomada mutica Morawitz, 1872
183. Nomada mavromoustakisi Schwarz and Standfuss, 2007
184. Nomada nausicaa Schmiedeknecht, 1882
185. Nomada nobilis Herrich-Schäffer, 1839
186. Nomada oculata Friese, 1921
187. Nomada ovaliceps Schwarz, 1981
188. Nomada pallispinosa Schwarz, 1967
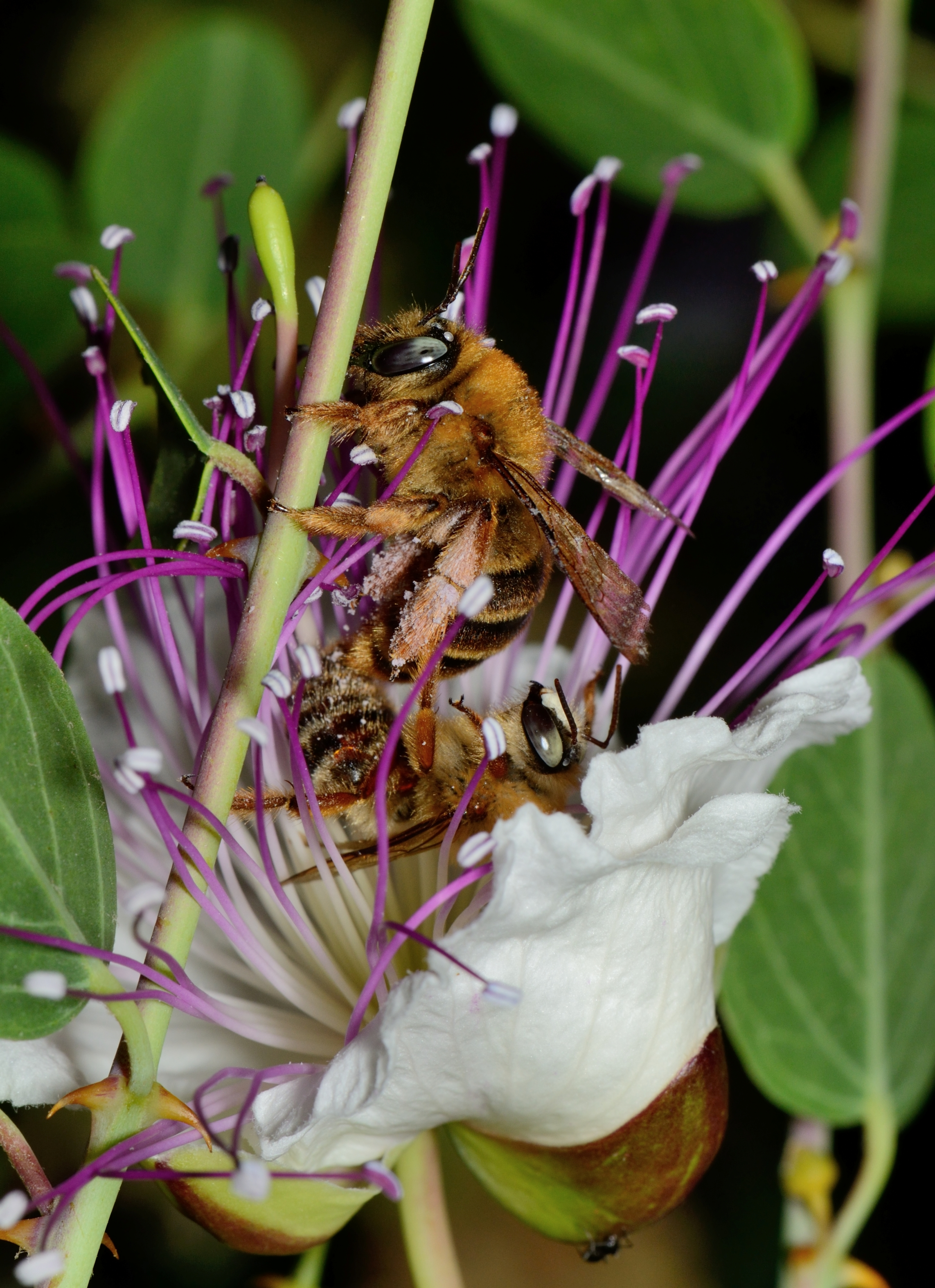
189. Xylocopa olivieri, copulation
  Nomada propinqua Schmiedeknecht, 1882
190. Nomada rubiginosa Pérez, 1884
191. Nomada rubricollis Schwarz, 1967
192. Nomada rufohirta Morawitz, 1895
193. Nomada sexfasciata Panzer, 1799
194. Nomada stoeckherti Pittioni, 1951
195. Nomada thersites Schmiedeknecht 1882
196. Nomada tridentirostris Dours, 1873
197. Parammobatodes maroccanus (Warncke, 1983)
198. Parammobatodes nuristanus (Warncke, 1983)
199. Parammobatodes rozeni Schwarz, 2003
200. Pasites maculatus Jurine, 1807
201. Schmiedeknechtia verhoeffi Mavromoustakis 1959
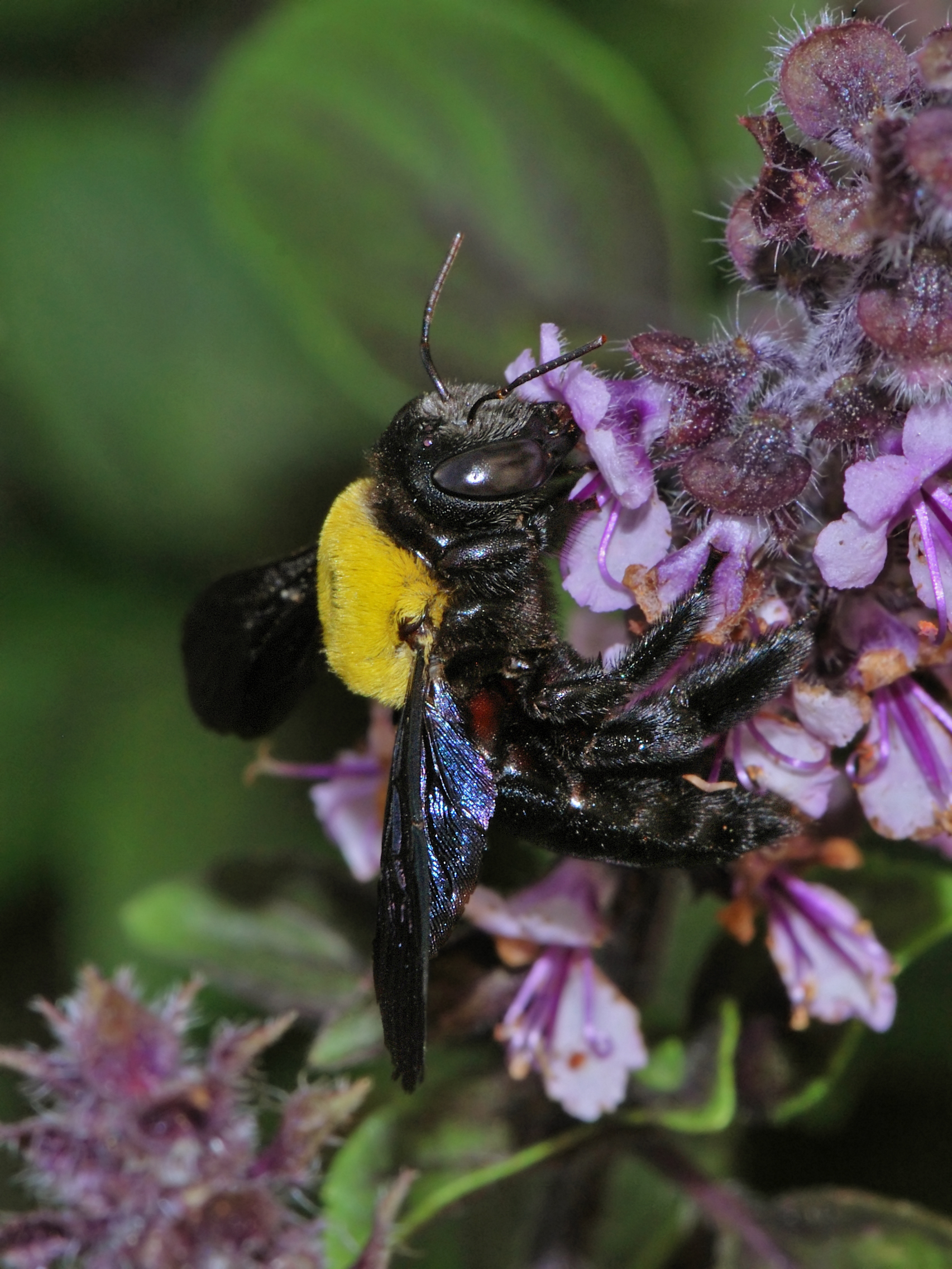
202. Xylocopa pubescens, female
  Tarsalia ancyliformis Popov, 1935
203. Tarsalia mimetes (Cockerell, 1933)
204. Tetralonia malvae (Rossi, 1790)
205. Thyreus elegans (Morawitz, 1878)
206. Thyreus histrionicus (Illiger, 1806)
207. Thyreus hyalinatus (Vachal, 1903)
208. Thyreus ramosellus (Cockerell, 1919)
209. Thyreus ramosus (Lepeletier, 1841)
210. Thyreus tricuspis (Pérez, 1883)
211. Thyreus truncatus (Pérez, 1883)
212. Xylocopa iris (Christ, 1791) דבורת-עץ עדינה
213. Xylocopa olivieri Lepeletier, 1841 צלפונית מפוספסת
214. Xylocopa pubescens Spinola, 1838 דבורת-עץ צהובה
215. Xylocopa rufa Friese, 1901 צלפונית חומה
216. Xylocopa sulcatipes Maa, 1970 דבורת-עץ שחורה
217. Xylocopa ustulata Smith, 1854
218. Xylocopa valga Gerstacker, 1872 דבורת-עץ צפונית
219. Xylocopa varentzowi Morawitz, 1895
220. Xylocopa violacea (Linnaeus, 1758) דבורת-עץ סגולה

== Nonindigenous species ==
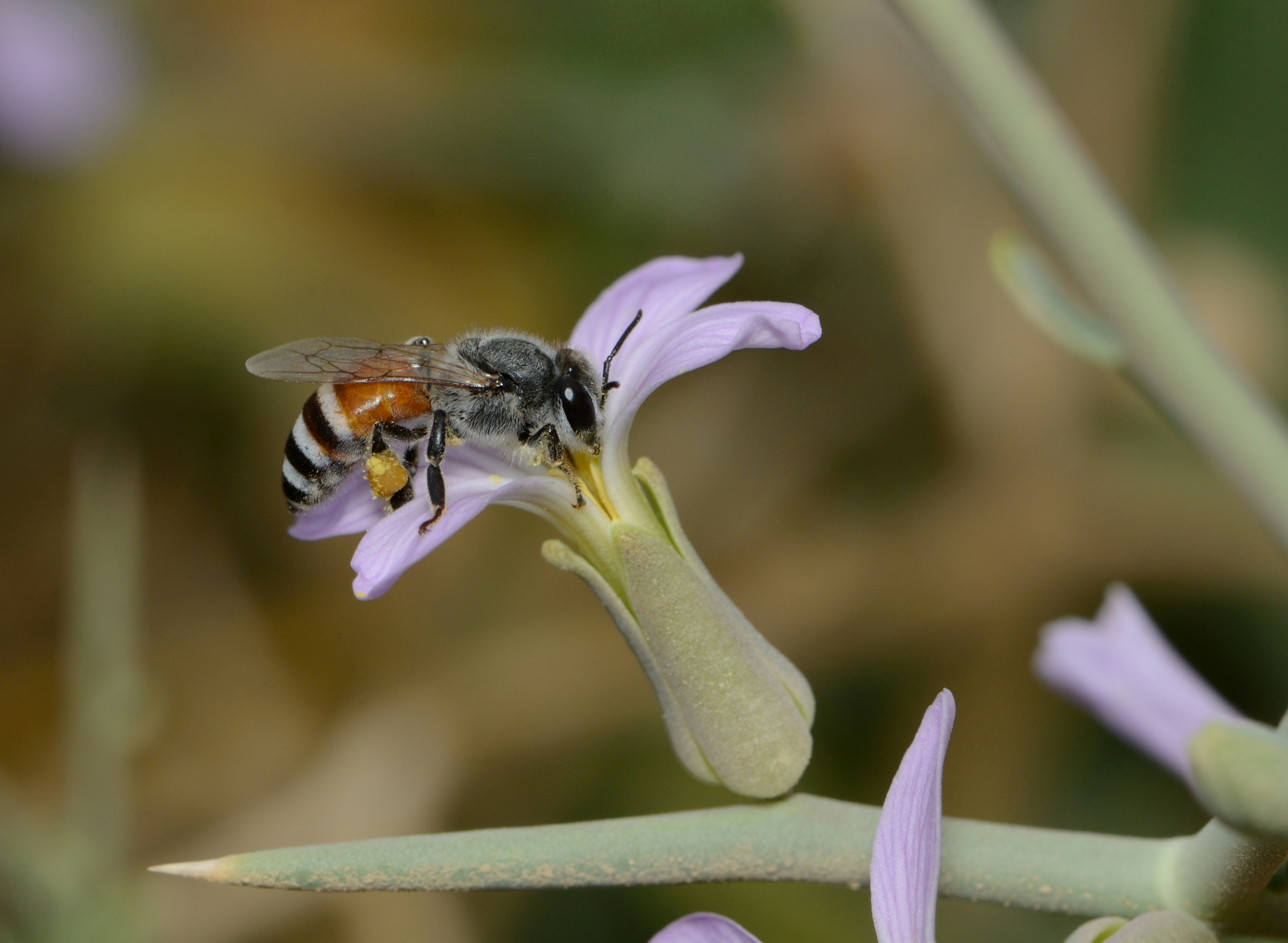
Apis florea, worker

=== Apidae ===
1. Apis florea Fabricius, 1787 דבורת-הדבש הננסית
2. Apis mellifera ligustica Spinola, 1806 דבורת הדבש האיטלקית
