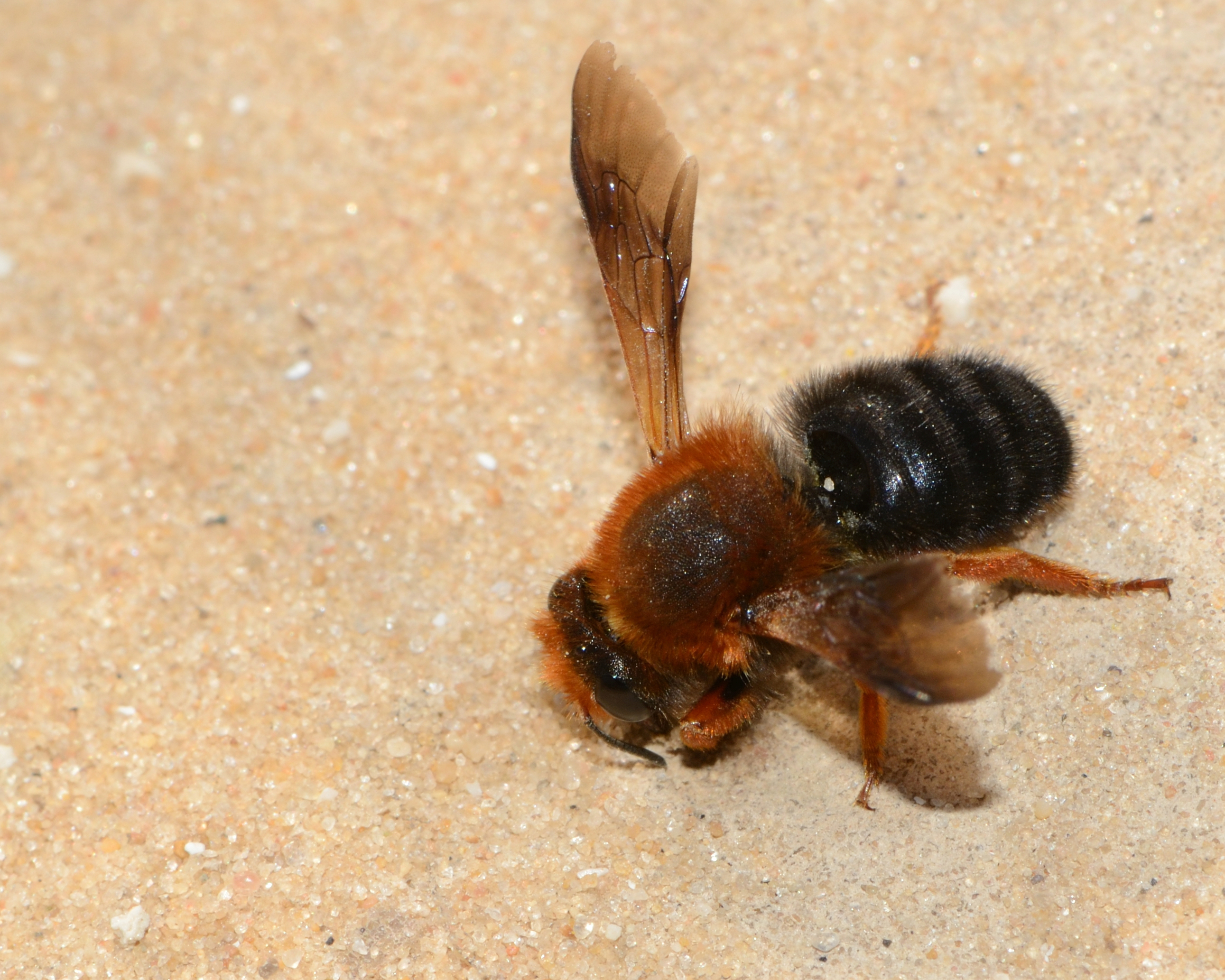
- Female M. sicula collecting sand to build its nest

Scientific classification
- Kingdom: Animalia
- Phylum: Arthropoda
- Clade: Pancrustacea
- Class: Insecta
- Order: Hymenoptera
- Family: Megachilidae
- Genus: Megachile
- Subgenus: Chalicodoma; Lepeletier, 1841

= Chalicodoma =

Subgenus of leafcutter bees (Megachile)

Chalicodoma is a subgenus of the bee genus Megachile in the family Megachilidae.

== Species ==
- Megachile albocristata
- Megachile albonotata
- Megachile alborufa
- Megachile apennina
- Megachile atrocastanea
- Megachile baetica
- Megachile brunissima
- Megachile canescens
- Megachile cressa
- Megachile creutzburgi
- Megachile desertorum
- Megachile difficilis
- Megachile duala
- Megachile formosa
- Megachile fuerteventurae
- Megachile fulvohirta
- Megachile gessorum
- Megachile heinii
- Megachile hirsuta
- Megachile hungarica
- Megachile imperialis
- Megachile incerta
- Megachile insolita
- Megachile jeanneli
- Megachile karatauensis
- Megachile karooensis
- Megachile kashmirensis
- Megachile ladakhensis
- Megachile lefebvrei
- Megachile leonum
- Megachile lucidifrons
- Megachile magadiensis
- Megachile manicata
- Megachile marina
- Megachile mauritaniae
- Megachile mongoliae
- Megachile monstrifica
- Megachile montenegrensis
- Megachile morsitans
- Megachile murina
- Megachile nasidens
- Megachile nigrita
- Megachile palaestina
- Megachile pallida
- Megachile parietina
- Megachile pasteelsi
- Megachile povolnyi
- Megachile pseudofulva
- Megachile pyrenaica
- Megachile richtersveldensis
- Megachile roeweri
- Megachile rufescens
- Megachile rufitarsis
- Megachile sarahae
- Megachile sefrensis
- Megachile sicula
- Megachile sinensis
- Megachile tenorai
- Megachile wfkirbyi
