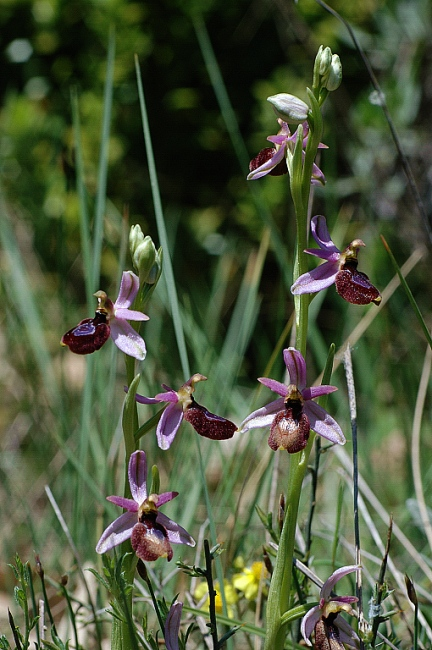
- Vercors, France

Scientific classification
- Kingdom: Plantae
- Clade: Tracheophytes
- Clade: Angiosperms
- Clade: Monocots
- Order: Asparagales
- Family: Orchidaceae
- Subfamily: Orchidoideae
- Genus: Ophrys
- Species: O. × flavicans

Binomial name
- Ophrys × flavicans Vis.

Synonyms
- List: Ophrys × agustinii Kreutz; Ophrys × aurelia P.Delforge, Devillers-Tersch. & Devillers; Ophrys × azurea H.Baumann & Künkele; Ophrys × balearica P.Delforge; Ophrys × benacensis (Reisigl) O.Danesch & E.Danesch; Ophrys bertolonii subsp. flavicans (Vis.) K.Richt.; Ophrys bertolonii subsp. aurelia (P.Delforge, Devillers-Tersch. & Devillers) Kreutz; Ophrys bertolonii subsp. balearica (P.Delforge) L.Sáez & Rosselló; Ophrys bertolonii subsp. benacensis (Reisigl) P.Delforge; Ophrys bertolonii subsp. bertoloniiformis (O.Danesch & E.Danesch) H.Sund.; Ophrys bertolonii subsp. catalaunica (O.Danesch & E.Danesch) Soca; Ophrys bertolonii subsp. drumana (P.Delforge) Kreutz; Ophrys bertolonii subsp. explanata (Lojac.) Soca; Ophrys bertolonii subsp. magniflora (Geniez & Melki) Soca; Ophrys bertolonii subsp. saratoi (E.G.Camus) Soca; Ophrys × bertoloniiformis O.Danesch & E.Danesch; Ophrys × bertoloniiformis subsp. benacensis Reisigl; Ophrys × bertoloniiformis subsp. explanata (Lojac.) Hennecke & S.Munzinger; Ophrys × bilineata (Barla) Fiori & Paol.; Ophrys × calabrica H.Baumann & Künkele; Ophrys × catalaunica O.Danesch & E.Danesch; Ophrys × couloniana P.Delforge & C.Delforge; Ophrys × dekegheliana P.Delforge; Ophrys × disjecta Murr; Ophrys × drumana P.Delforge; Ophrys × explanata (Lojac.) P.Delforge; Ophrys × fucinis Soca; Ophrys × gelmii Murr; Ophrys × grinincensis P.Delforge; Ophrys × magniflora Geniez & Melki; Ophrys × melitensis (Salk.) Devillers-Tersch. & Devillers; Ophrys × monopolitana H.Baumann & Künkele; Ophrys × montserratensis Cadevall; Ophrys × motolesensis Soca; Ophrys × promontorii O.Danesch & E.Danesch; Ophrys × pseudobertolonii subsp. bertoloniiformis (O.Danesch & E.Danesch) H.Baumann & Künkele; Ophrys × pseudobertolonii subsp. catalaunica (O.Danesch & E.Danesch) H.Baumann & Künkele; Ophrys × rosae D'Alonzo; Ophrys × sandrana Benigni, Barigelli & Petroselli; Ophrys × saratoi E.G.Camus; Ophrys × saratoi subsp. benacensis (Reisigl) Del Prete; Ophrys × saratoi subsp. gelmii (Murr) H.Baumann & Künkele; Ophrys sphegodes subsp. melitensis Salk.; Ophrys × tarentina Gölz & H.R.Reinhard; Ophrys × zonnoi Soca

= Ophrys × flavicans =

Hybrid species of orchid

Ophrys × flavicans is a hybrid species of orchid found in Spain, the Balearic Islands, France, mainland Italy, Sicily and former Yugoslavia. It is a hybrid between Ophrys bertolonii and Ophrys sphegodes. It has a large number of synonyms, either as other hybrid species, such as Ophrys × drumana and Ophrys × bertoloniiformis, or as infrataxa of other species, such as Ophrys bertolonii subsp. flavicans.

== Description ==
Ophrys × flavicans is herbaceous with an erect stem 15–30 cm (6–12 in) high. The flowers are grouped into a more-or-less lax inflorescence. They have ovate to lanceolate pink to lilac sepals. The lateral petals are elongated, pink to brownish red, with greenish central veins and wavy margins. The labellum is reddish brown, with marginal hairs, and a glossy grey-blue central patch.

== Taxonomy ==
The hybrid has been given many scientific names. As of December 2023, Plants of the World Online regarded the earliest and therefore the one with priority as Ophrys × flavicans, published by Roberto de Visiani in 1842.

== Ecology ==
Like the other species of Ophrys, no nectar is produced, fertilization being effected by pseudocopulation by males of the family Megachilidae, including Megachile albonotata, Megachile benoisti, Megachile manicata, Megachile parietina and Megachile sicula.

== See also ==
- List of the orchids of Metropolitan France
