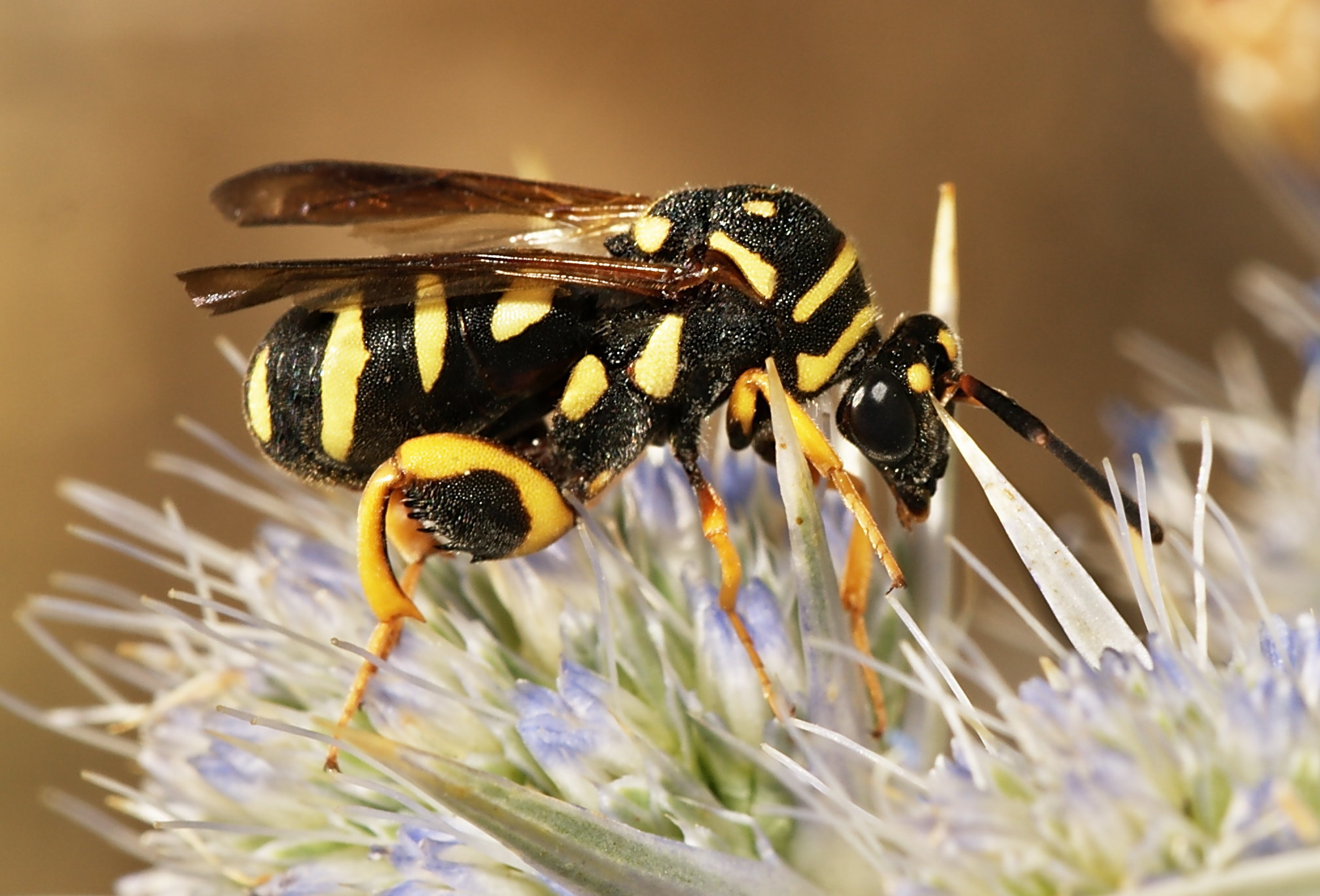
- Leucospis gigas photographed in Sierra Nevada, Spain.

Scientific classification
- Kingdom: Animalia
- Phylum: Arthropoda
- Class: Insecta
- Order: Hymenoptera
- Family: Leucospidae
- Genus: Leucospis
- Species: L. gigas

Binomial name
- Leucospis gigas Fabricius, 1793

= Leucospis gigas =

Species of wasp

Leucospis gigas is a species of parasitoid wasp in the family Leucospidae. It is a parasitoid of Megachile desertorum and found throughout Eurasia.
