= Megachile angustistrigata =

Scientific classification
- Domain: Eukaryota
- Kingdom: Animalia
- Phylum: Arthropoda
- Class: Insecta
- Order: Hymenoptera
- Family: Megachilidae
- Genus: Megachile
- Species: M. angustistrigata

Binomial name
- Megachile angustistrigata Alfken, 1924

Species of leafcutter bee (Megachile)

Megachile angustistrigata is a species of bee in the family Megachilidae. It was described by Alfken in 1924.
