= Megachile cinnamomea =

Scientific classification
- Domain: Eukaryota
- Kingdom: Animalia
- Phylum: Arthropoda
- Class: Insecta
- Order: Hymenoptera
- Family: Megachilidae
- Genus: Megachile
- Species: M. cinnamomea

Binomial name
- Megachile cinnamomea Alfken, 1935

Species of leafcutter bee (Megachile)

Megachile cinnamomea is a species of bee in the family Megachilidae.

It was described by Alfken in 1926. The species can be found in a number of places like Morocco, Algeria, Tunisia, Israel and possibly Turkey and Armenia.
