= Megachile albidula =

Scientific classification
- Domain: Eukaryota
- Kingdom: Animalia
- Phylum: Arthropoda
- Class: Insecta
- Order: Hymenoptera
- Family: Megachilidae
- Genus: Megachile
- Species: M. albidula

Binomial name
- Megachile albidula Alfken, 1931

Species of leafcutter bee (Megachile)

Megachile albidula is a species of bee in the family Megachilidae. It was described by Johann Dietrich Alfken in 1931.
