= Leucospis sinensis =

Scientific classification
- Kingdom: Animalia
- Phylum: Arthropoda
- Clade: Pancrustacea
- Class: Insecta
- Order: Hymenoptera
- Family: Leucospidae
- Genus: Leucospis
- Species: L. sinensis

Binomial name
- Leucospis sinensis Walker, 1862

Species of wasp

Leucospis sinensis is a chalcid wasp in the Leucospidae family. The species was first described by the English entomologist Francis Walker in 1862. The Latin species epithet sinensis means "Chinese." Originating from East Asia, the first sightings of this species were reported in Germany and Austria in 2025 and 2026.

== Description ==
The females are about 14 mm long. The chalcid wasps are predominantly black. The scapus (antennae) is partially yellow ventrally. The pronotum has two long yellow to reddish-brown transverse stripes. On the mesoscutum (dorsal plate) there are two small yellow or reddish-brown spots submedially. The mesoscutellum has a U-shaped yellow or reddish-brown spot posteriorly. The metapleurae are reddish-brown, the wings brownish, and the posterior coxae apically reddish-brown. The posterior femora are yellow ventrobasally and dorsoapically. On the propodeum there is a yellow or reddish-brown spot in the center of the posterior part. A broad yellow transverse band runs across tergite T1. The tergite T5 has a yellow transverse band at the back.

The pronotum has a weak discal keel and distinct premarginal keels. The posterior femora have a row of nine teeth ventrally, with the basal tooth being much shorter than the following six teeth. The posterior tibiae merge ventroapically into a spine. The medially arched propodeum has a weakly pronounced median keel (carina). The metasoma is strongly convex dorsally and medially. Tergites T5 and T6 have a central longitudinal groove into which the ovipositor is folded when at rest. Tergite T1 has a smooth, weak median groove. The medium-sized drill valves are only half the length of tergite T5, according to other sources, 0.8 times the length.

In males, the abdominal segments fuse together to form an armor-like structure, similar to other Leucospis species. The coloration of the posterior abdomen differs from that of females. Instead of one yellow transverse band, males have two.

== Egg laying and development ==
The females of the host genus Isodontia create their brood cells in hollow plant stems, especially reeds, or similar natural cavities and line them with grass and hay stalks. The female of L. sinensis drills a hole in the host nest with her ovipositor. In contrast to other parasitic Hymenoptera, the ovipositor flaps apparently only serve a protective function for the ovipositor itself and are not actively used during drilling. To drill, the ovipositor flaps are extended away from the abdomen, and the fine ovipositor is pulled out of the sheath laterally. The tip of the ovipositor is then directed towards the location of the hole. With the help of the rough surface of the ovipositor and its tip, a hole is drilled into the brood cell wall. One drilling process can sometimes take half an hour. At the end, an egg is laid in the host brood cell. In the first larval stage, the Leucospidae larvae search the brood cell for potential competitors, which they then "eliminated." Only in the second larval stage do they begin to act as ectoparasites, sucking body fluids from the (mature) host larva.

== Taxonomy ==
Leucospis sinensis belongs to the petiolata species group within the genus Leucospis. The species has the following synonyms:

- Leucospis fuliginosa, 1922
- Leucospis okinawensis, 1918

== Habitat ==
Leucospis sinensis is native to East Asia, where it is found in Japan, the People's Republic of China (Jiangsu and Shanghai) and Taiwan. Furthermore, the first record of the species from South Korea was published in 2017.

=== Europe ===
Since the early 2020s, an increasing number of photographically documented sightings from Europe have been reported in various nature observation forums and online services. The first record in Europe was apparently in 2013 in Piedmont in northern Italy. Further known observations in Italy date from 2019 and 2020. In 2025, more reports came from Italy, Corsica, France (southern France to the greater Paris area) and Hungary, and in 2025 and 2026 also from Germany and Austria.

== Gallery ==
Photographs of a female of Leucospis sinensis in July 2025 in the Schwetzinger Hardt nature reserve near Heidelberg and of a male in June 2026 at the same spot.

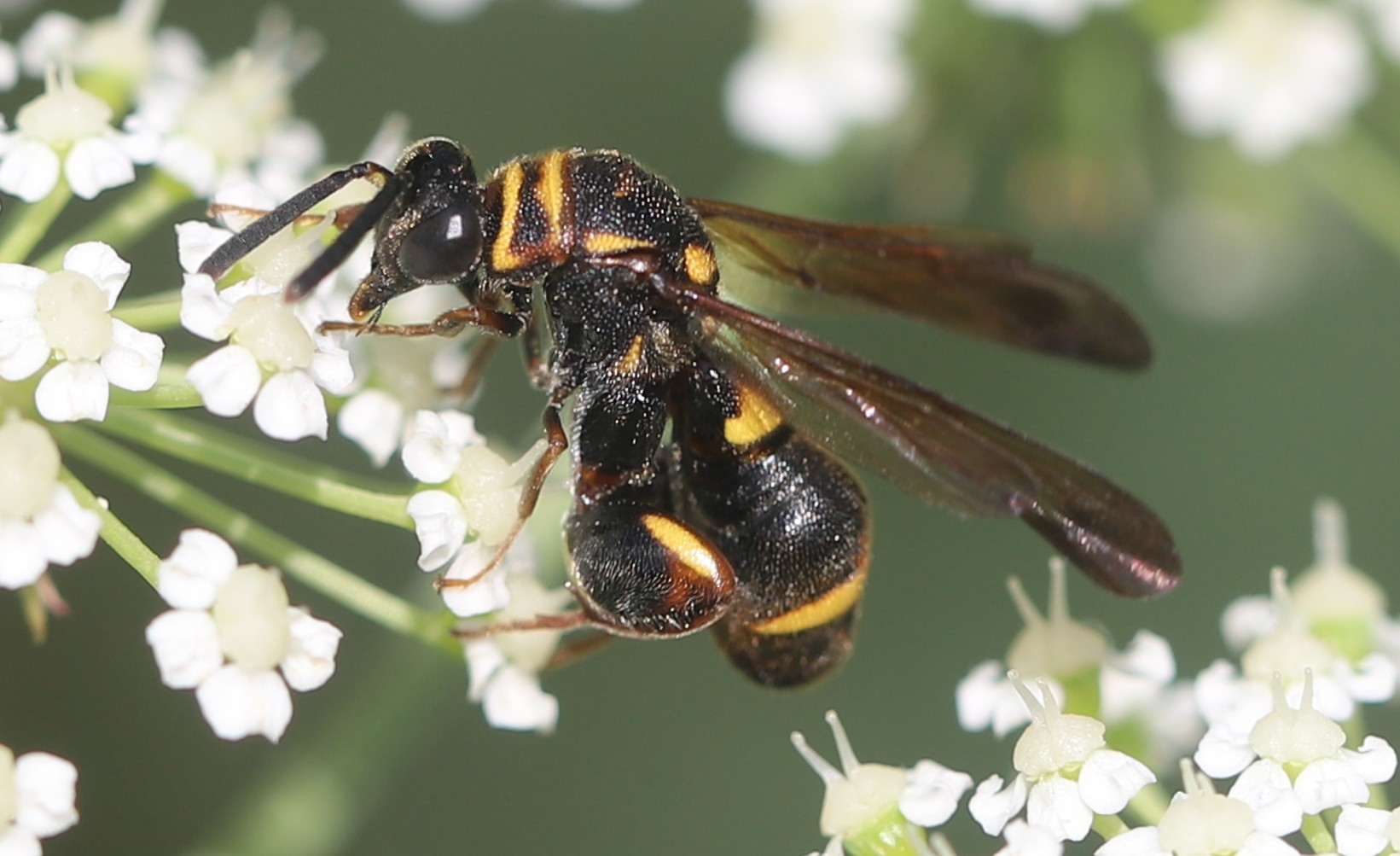
♀ on Peucedanum oreoselinum

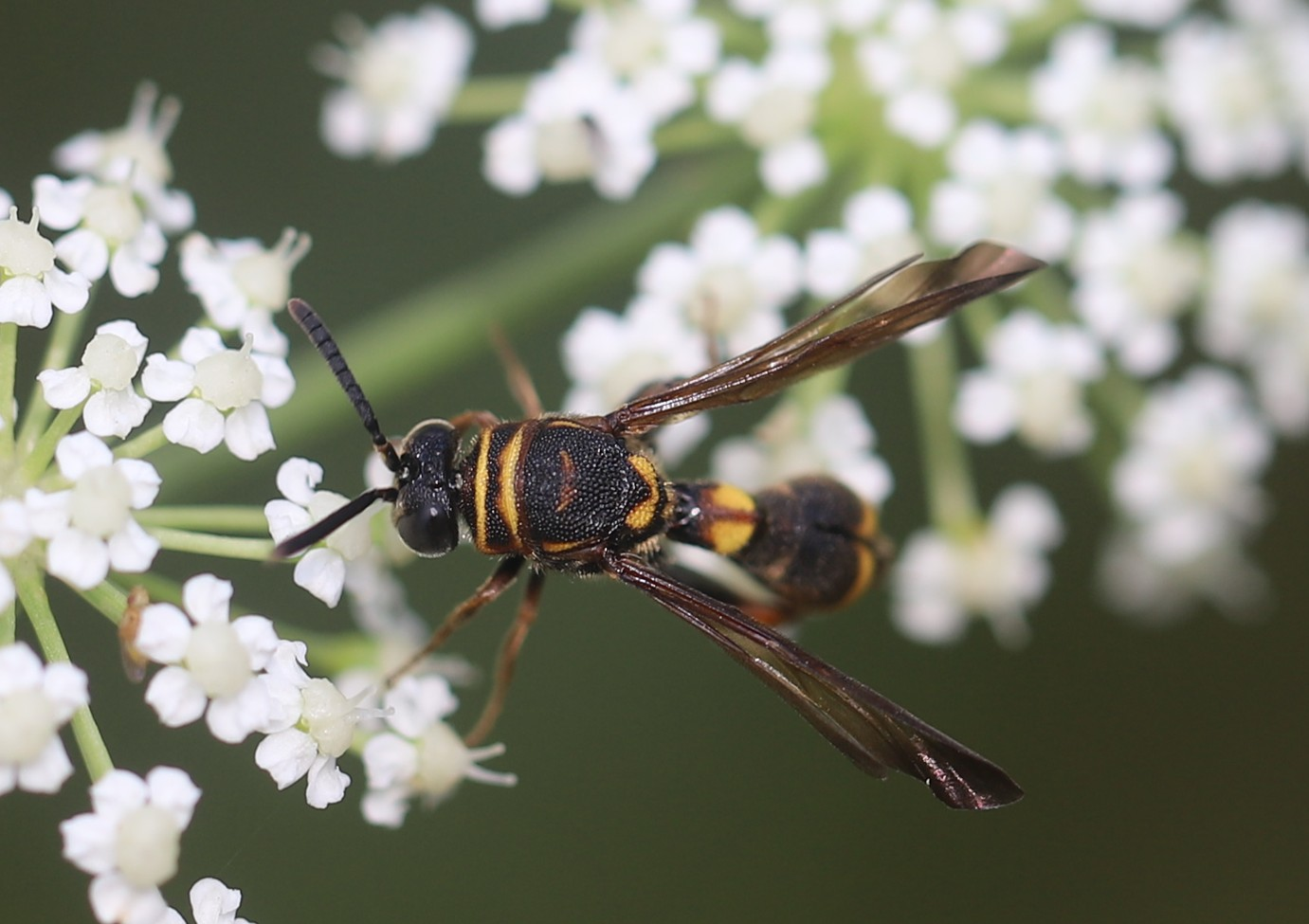
♀ – Dorsal view of the thorax

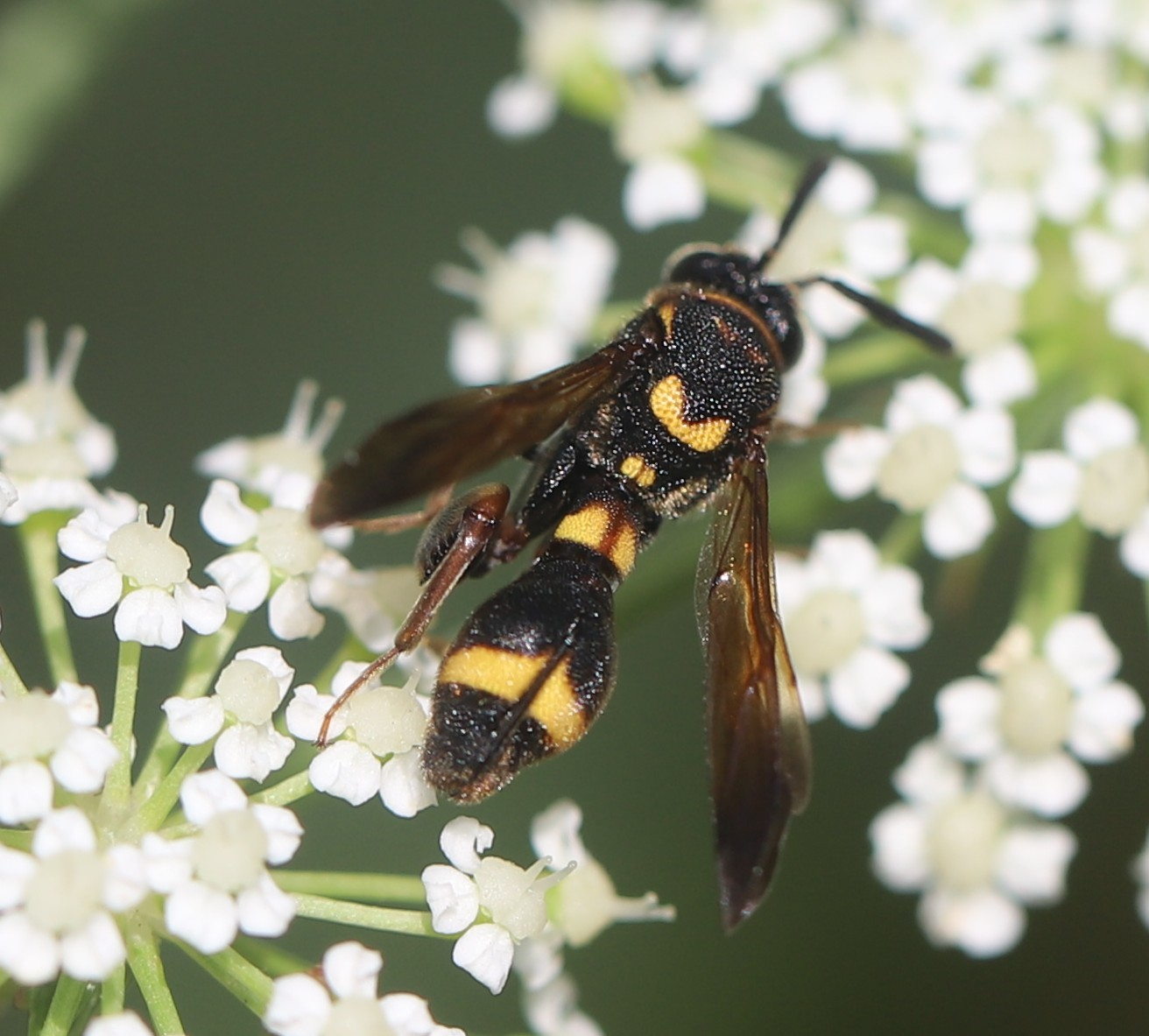
♀ – Dorsal view from behind

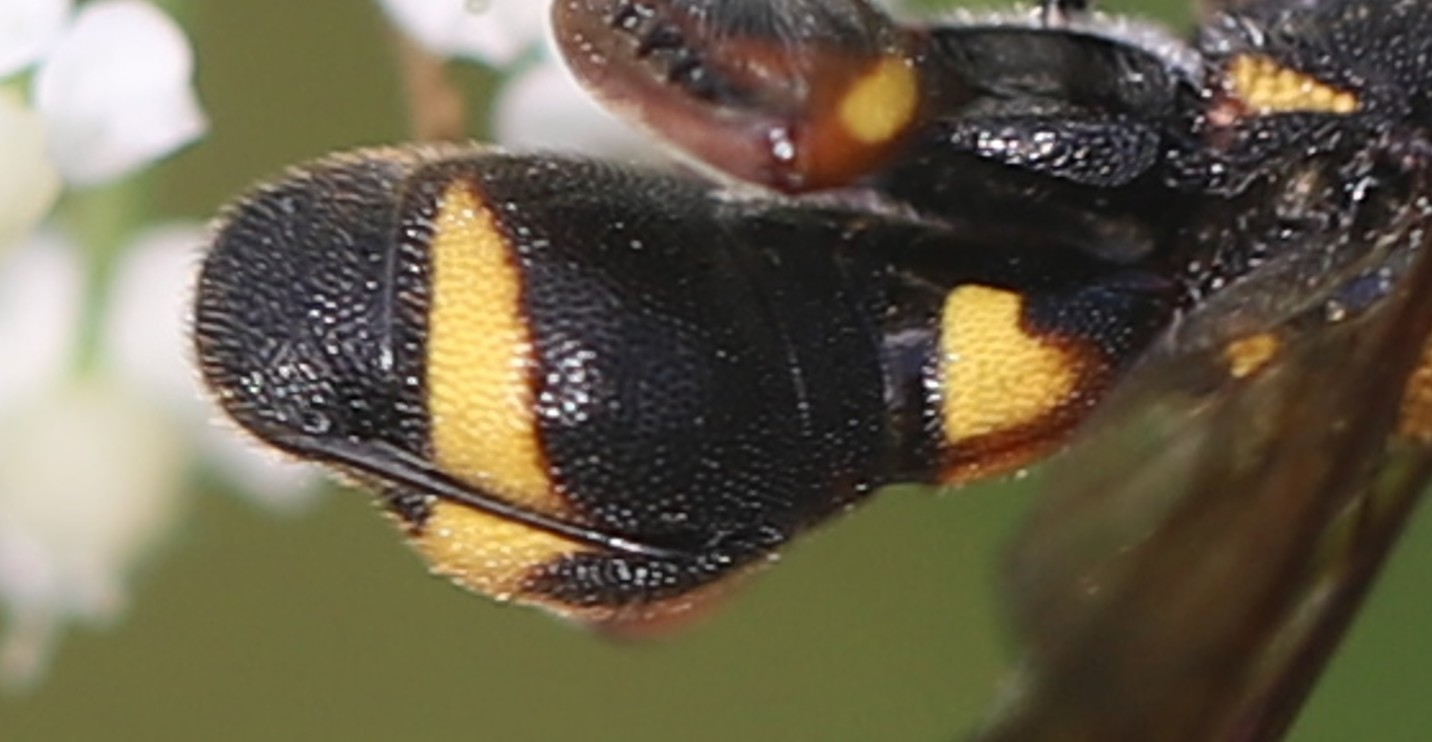
♀ – Drill valves on the abdomen

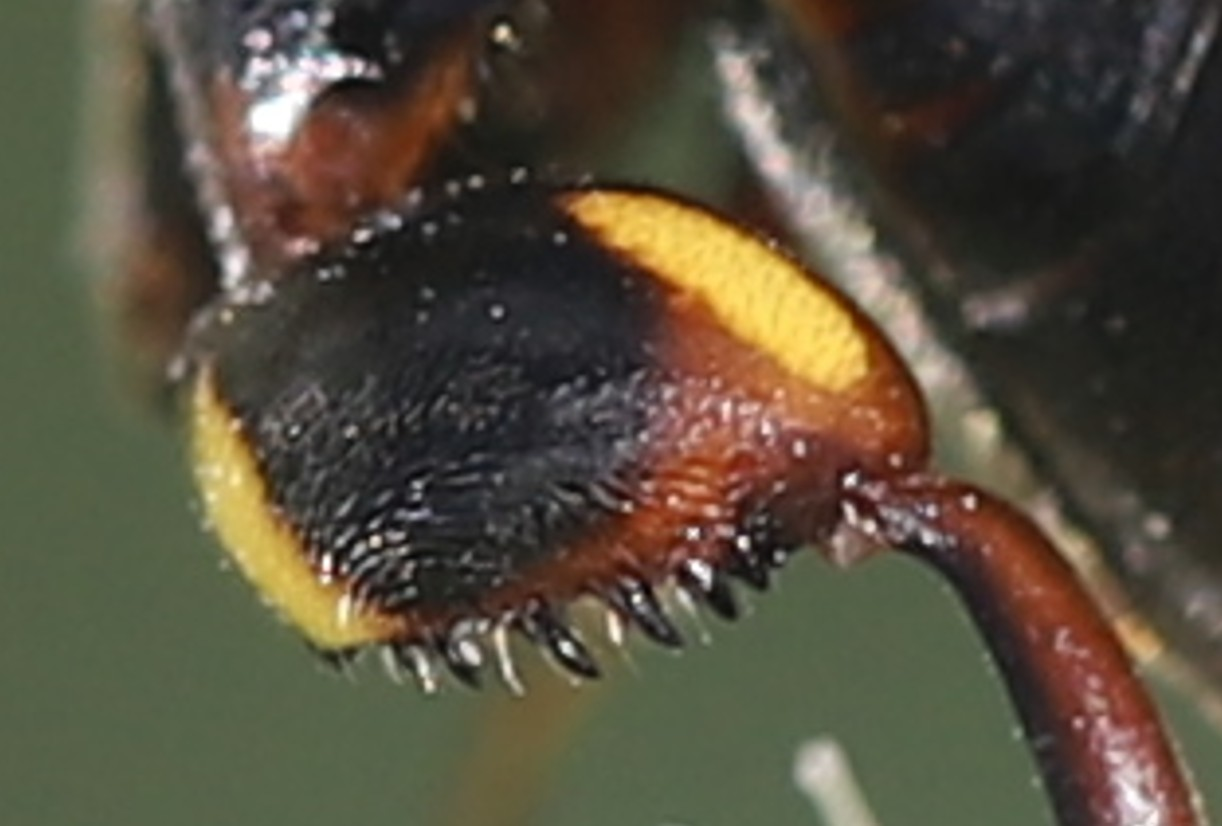
♀ – Tooth row on the apical ventral side of the posterior femur2026_06_27_Leucospis_sinensis_male.jpg2026_06_27_Leucospis_sinensis_male.jpg

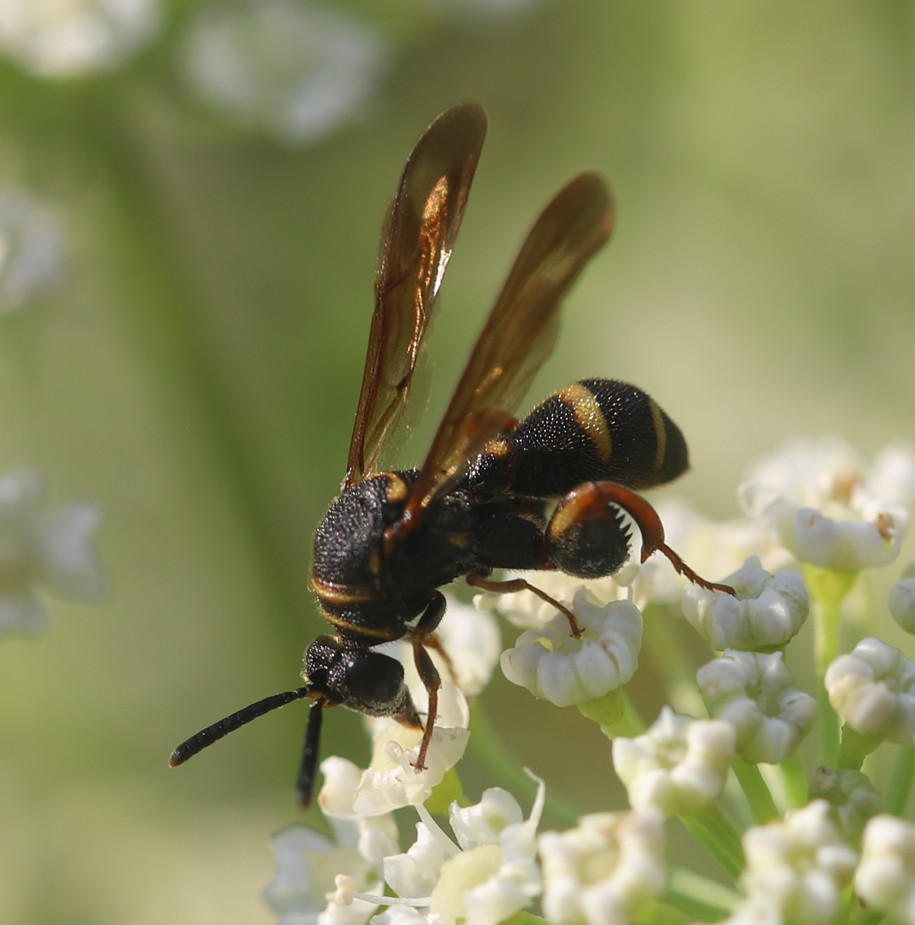
♂ – at the same spot in June 2026
