= Megachile submucida =

Scientific classification
- Domain: Eukaryota
- Kingdom: Animalia
- Phylum: Arthropoda
- Class: Insecta
- Order: Hymenoptera
- Family: Megachilidae
- Genus: Megachile
- Species: M. submucida

Binomial name
- Megachile submucida Alfken, 1926

Species of leafcutter bee (Megachile)

Megachile submucida is a species of bee in the family Megachilidae. It was described by Alfken in 1926.
