= Megachile lanigera =

Scientific classification
- Domain: Eukaryota
- Kingdom: Animalia
- Phylum: Arthropoda
- Class: Insecta
- Order: Hymenoptera
- Family: Megachilidae
- Genus: Megachile
- Species: M. lanigera

Binomial name
- Megachile lanigera Alfken, 1933

Species of leafcutter bee (Megachile)

Megachile lanigera is a species of bee in the family Megachilidae. It was described by Alfken in 1933.
