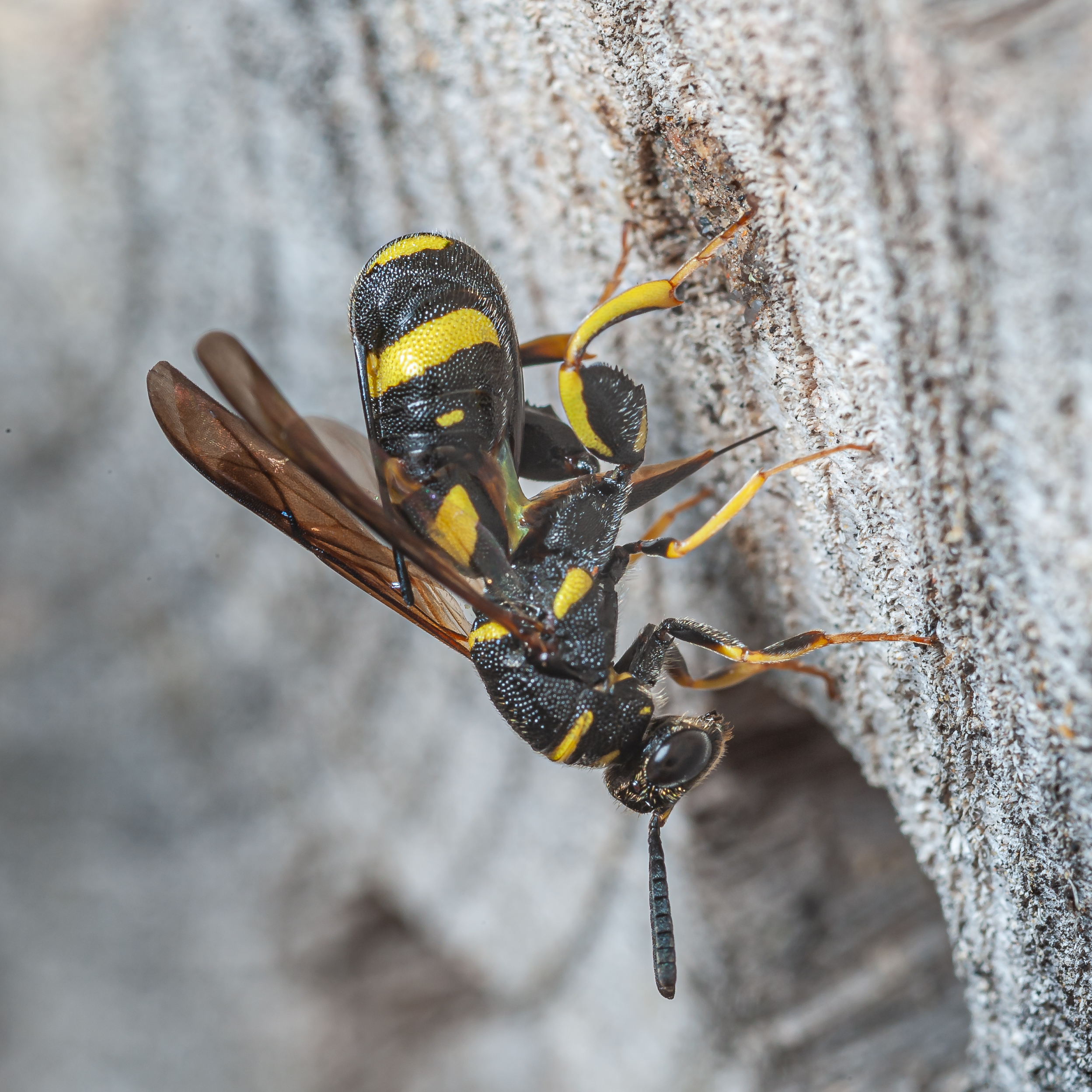
- Leucospis dorsigera. Female during oviposition

Scientific classification
- Kingdom: Animalia
- Phylum: Arthropoda
- Clade: Pancrustacea
- Class: Insecta
- Order: Hymenoptera
- Family: Leucospidae
- Genus: Leucospis
- Species: L. dorsigera

Binomial name
- Leucospis dorsigera Fabricius, 1775

Synonyms
- List: Coelogaster passaviensis Schrank, 1782; Leucospis algiric a Walker, 1862; Leucospis assimilis Westwood, 1834; Leucospis coelogaste r Hochenwarth, 1785; Leucospis dispar Fabricius, 1804; Leucospis dorsalis Fabricius; Leucospis dorsiger a Fabricius, 1775; Leucospis dubia Schrank, 1802; Leucospis fuesslini Hagenbach, 1822; Leucospis intermedia Spinola, 1808; Leucospis lepida Chevrier, 1872; Leucospis ligustica Nees, 1834; Leucospis scutellata Spinola, 1838; Leucospis sicelis Westwood, 1834; Leucospis spinolae Westwood, 1834; Leucospis turcestanica Radoszkowski; Leucospis turkestanica Radoszkowski, 1886; Leucospis vicina Fonscolombe, 1840

= Leucospis dorsigera =

Species of wasp

Leucospis dorsigera is a species of wasp belonging to the family Leucospidae.

== Distribution and habitat ==
This widely distributed species occurs from Eastern Russia through Europe (Austria, Croatia, Czech Republic, France, Germany, Hungary, Italy, Republic of Moldova, North Macedonia, Poland, Romania, Slovakia, Slovenia, Spain, Switzerland) to Near East and North Africa. Leucospis dorsigera inhabits meadows and wet meadows and other areas where their hosts are abundant.

== Description ==
Leucospis dorsigera can reach a length of 10–12 millimetres (0.39–0.47 in). This rather variable vespid-like species mimics a stinging wasp. Body is quite robust, with yellow stripes on a black ground color. The fore wings are folded longitudinally. The hind femora are swollen and toothed along the lower margin, with a large median and short lateral teeth. The female shows a relatively short gaster and the ovipositor is turned up, lies along the dorsal side of the metasoma and just reaches to the base of the gaster. In the males the fusion of many of the metasomal segments to form a capsule-like "carapace".

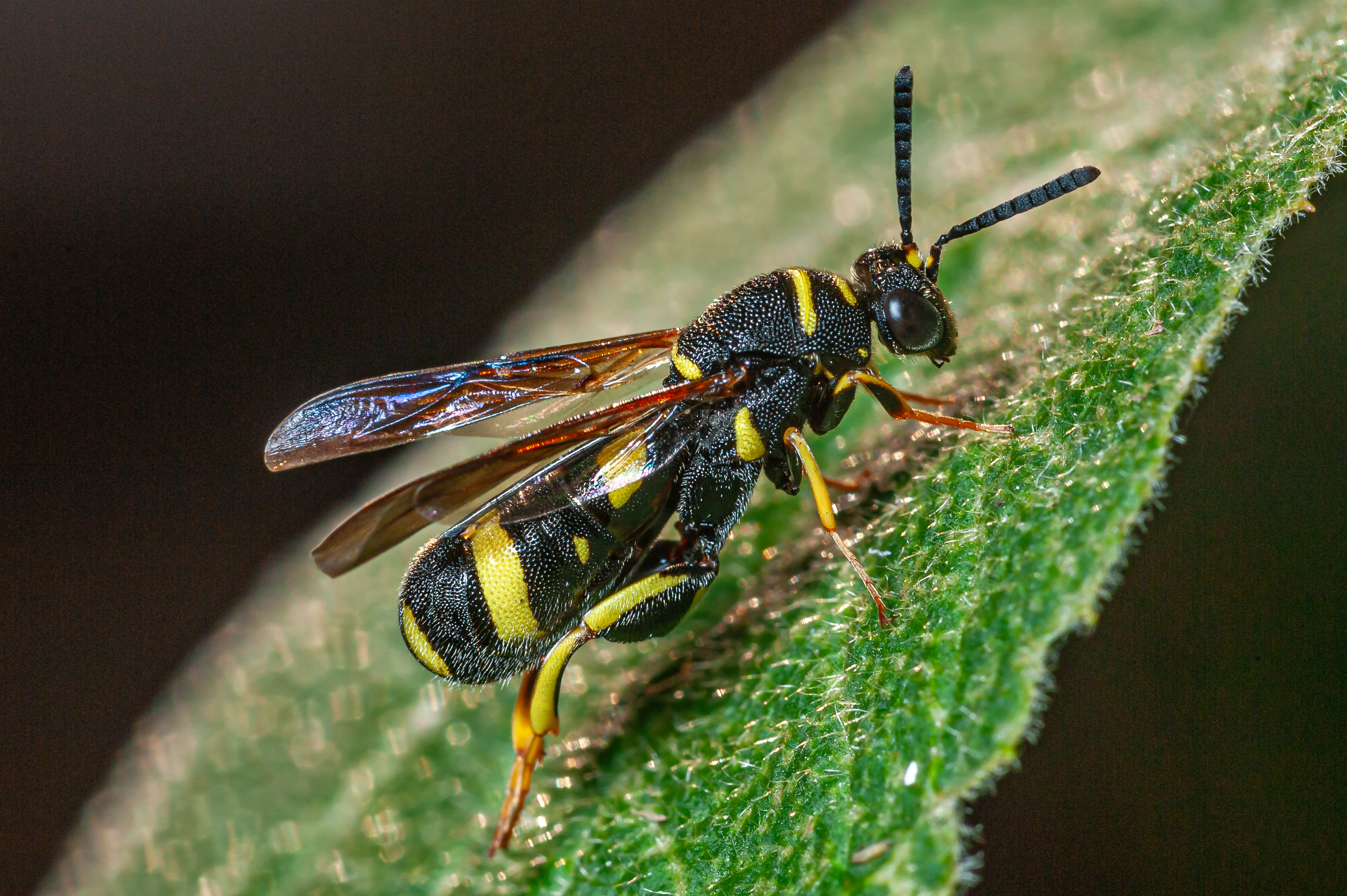
Leucospis dorsigera with the ovipositor lying along the dorsal side of the gaster

== Biology ==
Adults can be found from May to July. They mainly feed on nectar and pollen of Angelica sylvestris, Heracleum sphondylium and Scorzoneroides autumnalis.

This species is an ectoparasitoid of aculeate wasps or bees. Females penetrate with the long ovipositor into the bark of trees where they have located the larvae of these insects. Then they lay the eggs in the body of these larvae, that will be eaten by the newly-born wasps.

Females especially parasitize larvae belonging to the family Megachilidae, genera Anthidiellum, Anthidium, Hoplitis and Osmia. Larvae of Leucospis dorsigera also feed on larvae of Chelostoma florisomne and other larvae of Apidae (Megachilinae), Ichneumonidae (Xorides corcyrensis, Xoridinae) and Bostrychidae (Coleoptera).

== Bibliography ==
- Klug, F. (1818) European species of |Leucospis|., JOURBOOK: Isis, Jena Vol.: 2(9) Pg: 1475
- Boucek, Z. (1974) A revision of the Leucospidae (Hymenoptera: Chalcidoidea) of the world., JOURBOOK: Bulletin of the British Museum (Natural History) Entomology Vol.: Supplement 23 Pg: 241pp
- Dalla Torre, K.W. von (1898) Catalogus Hymenopterorum hucusque descriptorum systematicus et synonymicus. V. Chalcididae et, Pg: 598pp
- Walker, F. (1862) Characters of undescribed species of the genus |Leucospis|., JOURBOOK: Journal of Entomology Vol.: 1 Pg: 16-23
- Westwood, J.O. (1834) On |Leucospis|, a genus of hymenopterous insects., JOURBOOK: Entomological Magazine VOLUME: 2(2) PAGES: 212-218
