= Megachile toxopei =

Scientific classification
- Kingdom: Animalia
- Phylum: Arthropoda
- Class: Insecta
- Order: Hymenoptera
- Family: Megachilidae
- Genus: Megachile
- Species: M. toxopei

Binomial name
- Megachile toxopei Alfken, 1926

Species of leafcutter bee (Megachile)

Megachile toxopei is a species of bee in the family Megachilidae. It was described by Johann Dietrich Alfken in 1926.
