= Megachile japonica =

Scientific classification
- Domain: Eukaryota
- Kingdom: Animalia
- Phylum: Arthropoda
- Class: Insecta
- Order: Hymenoptera
- Family: Megachilidae
- Genus: Megachile
- Species: M. japonica

Binomial name
- Megachile japonica Alfken, 1903

Species of leafcutter bee (Megachile)

Megachile japonica is a species of bee in the family Megachilidae. It was described by Alfken in 1903.
