= Megachile roeweri =

Scientific classification
- Domain: Eukaryota
- Kingdom: Animalia
- Phylum: Arthropoda
- Class: Insecta
- Order: Hymenoptera
- Family: Megachilidae
- Genus: Megachile
- Species: M. roeweri

Binomial name
- Megachile roeweri (Alfken, 1927)

Species of leafcutter bee (Megachile)

Megachile roeweri is a species of bee in the family Megachilidae. It was described by Alfken in 1927.
