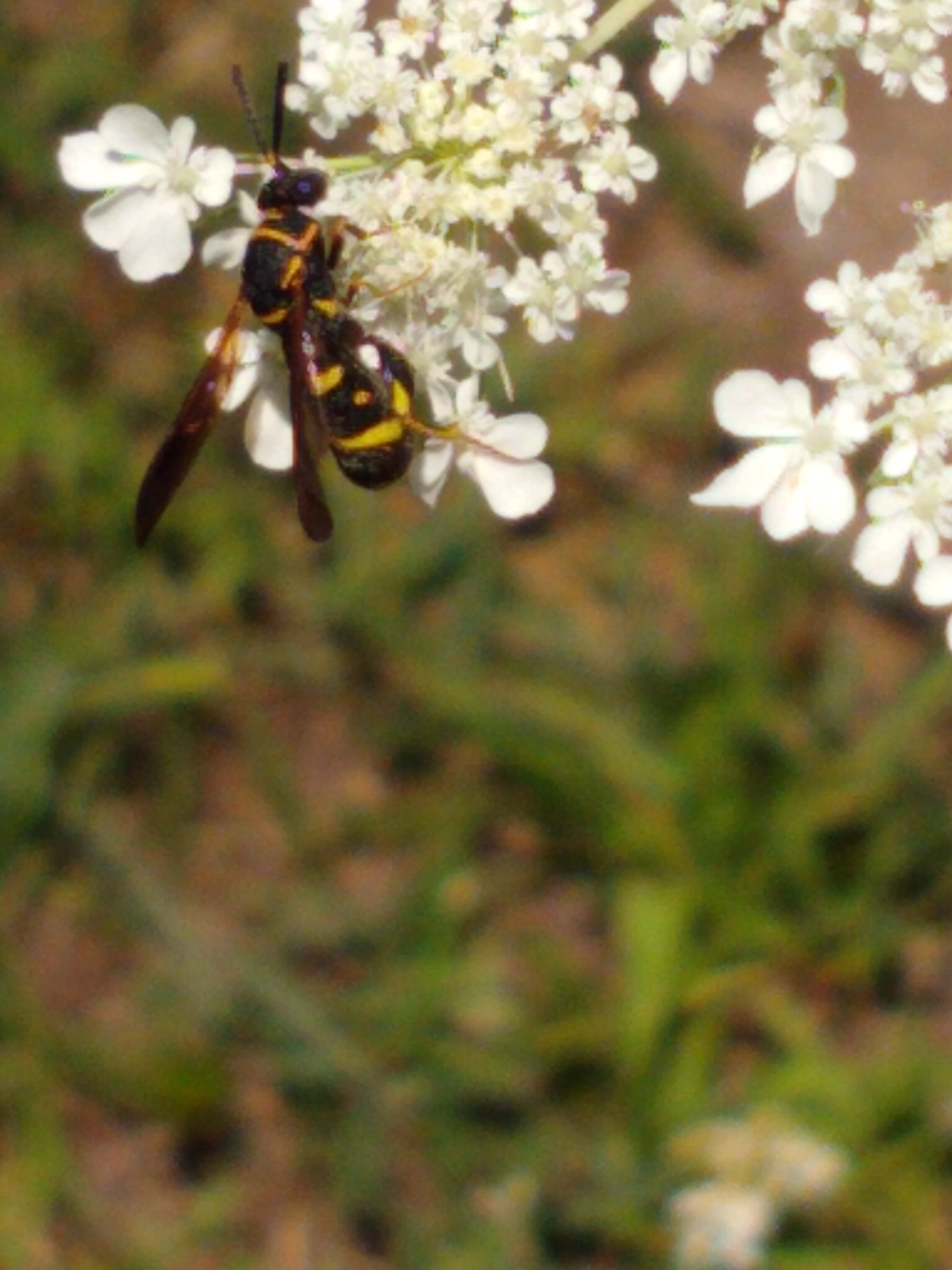
- Leucospis affinis pollinating wild carrot

Scientific classification
- Domain: Eukaryota
- Kingdom: Animalia
- Phylum: Arthropoda
- Class: Insecta
- Order: Hymenoptera
- Family: Leucospidae
- Genus: Leucospis
- Species: L. affinis

Binomial name
- Leucospis affinis Say, 1824

= Leucospis affinis =

Species of insect

Leucospis affinis is a species of parasitic wasp of megachilid bees. The species Ancistrocerus antilope is also a host. It can be found in North America.
