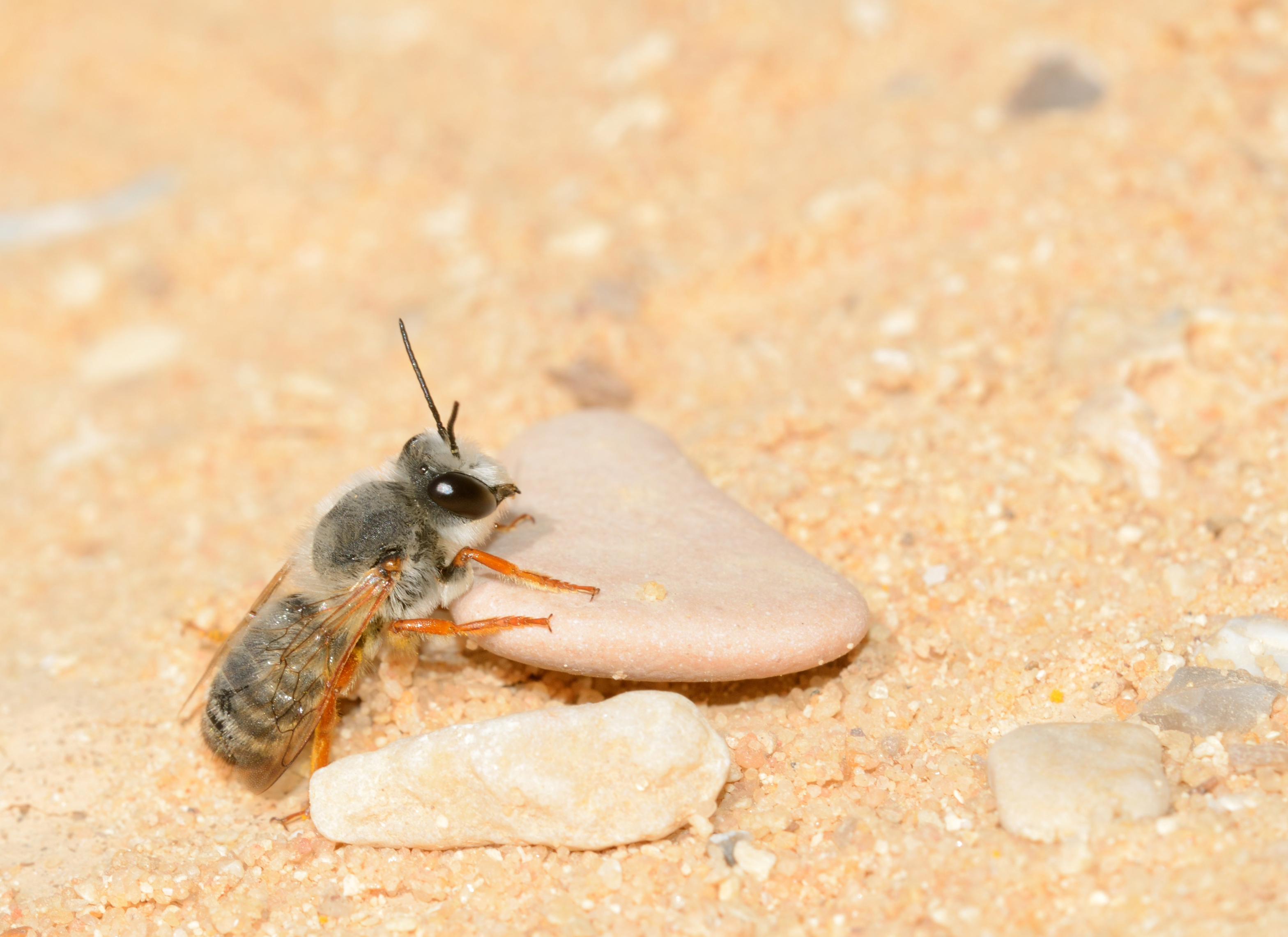

Scientific classification
- Domain: Eukaryota
- Kingdom: Animalia
- Phylum: Arthropoda
- Class: Insecta
- Order: Hymenoptera
- Family: Megachilidae
- Genus: Megachile
- Species: M. atrocastanea

Binomial name
- Megachile atrocastanea (Alfken, 1932)

= Megachile atrocastanea =

Species of leafcutter bee (Megachile)

Megachile atrocastanea is a species of bee in the family Megachilidae. It was described by Alfken in 1932.
