= List of the orchids of Metropolitan France =

This is a list of the orchids, sorted in alphabetical order, found in Metropolitan France.

== A ==
- Anacamptis laxiflora
- Anacamptis longicornu
- Anacamptis morio
- Anacamptis palustris

== C ==
- Cephalanthera longifolia

== D ==
- Dactylorhiza incarnata

== E ==
- Epipactis phyllanthes

== G ==
- Goodyera repens

== O ==
- Ophrys aurelia
- Ophrys catalaunica
- Ophrys × flavicans, syn. Ophrys × drumana
- Orchis mascula
- Ophrys saratoi

== S ==
- Serapias lingua
