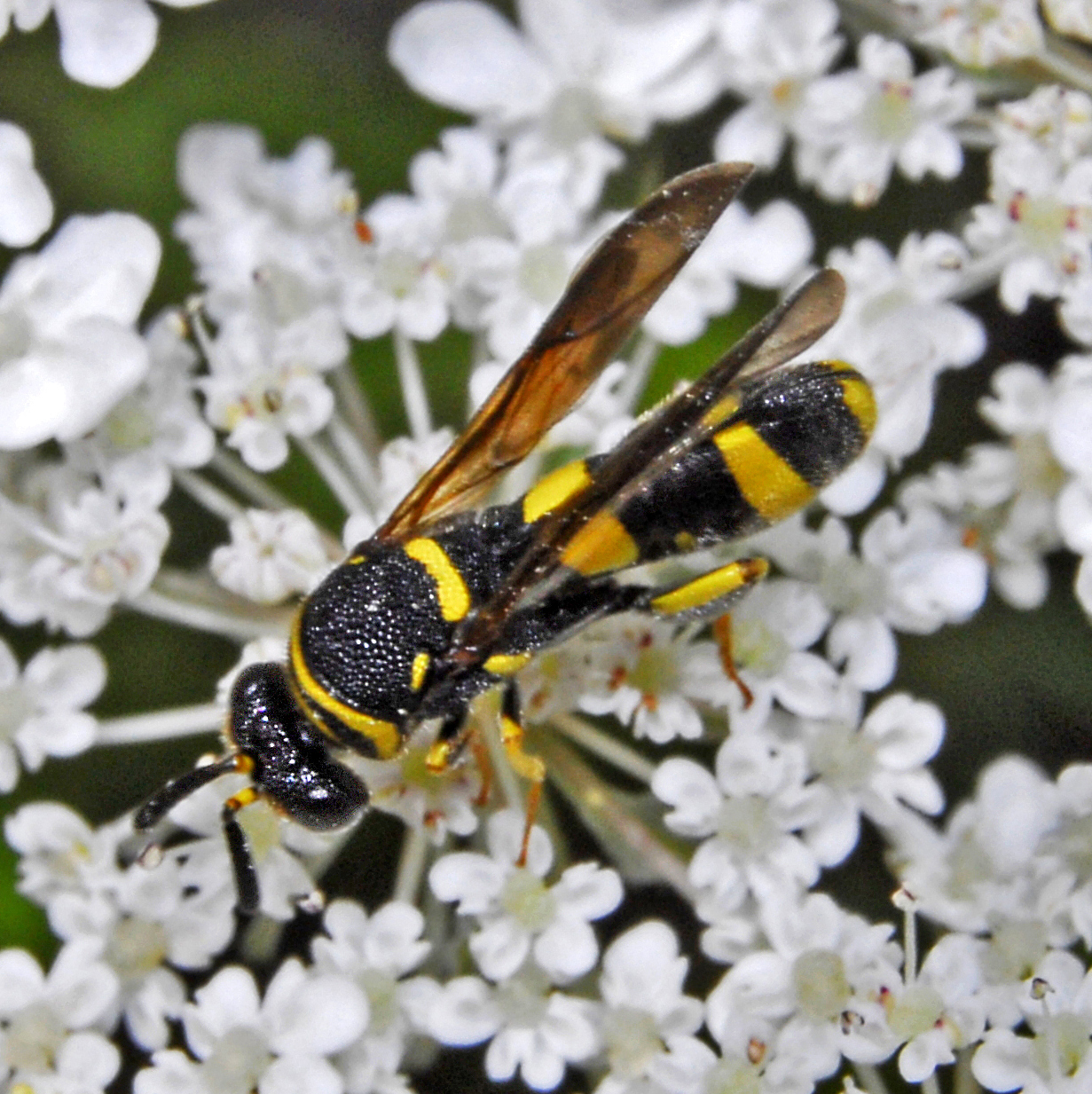
- Leucospis dorsigera

Scientific classification
- Kingdom: Animalia
- Phylum: Arthropoda
- Class: Insecta
- Order: Hymenoptera
- Family: Leucospidae
- Genus: Leucospis; Fabricius, 1775

= Leucospis =

Genus of wasps

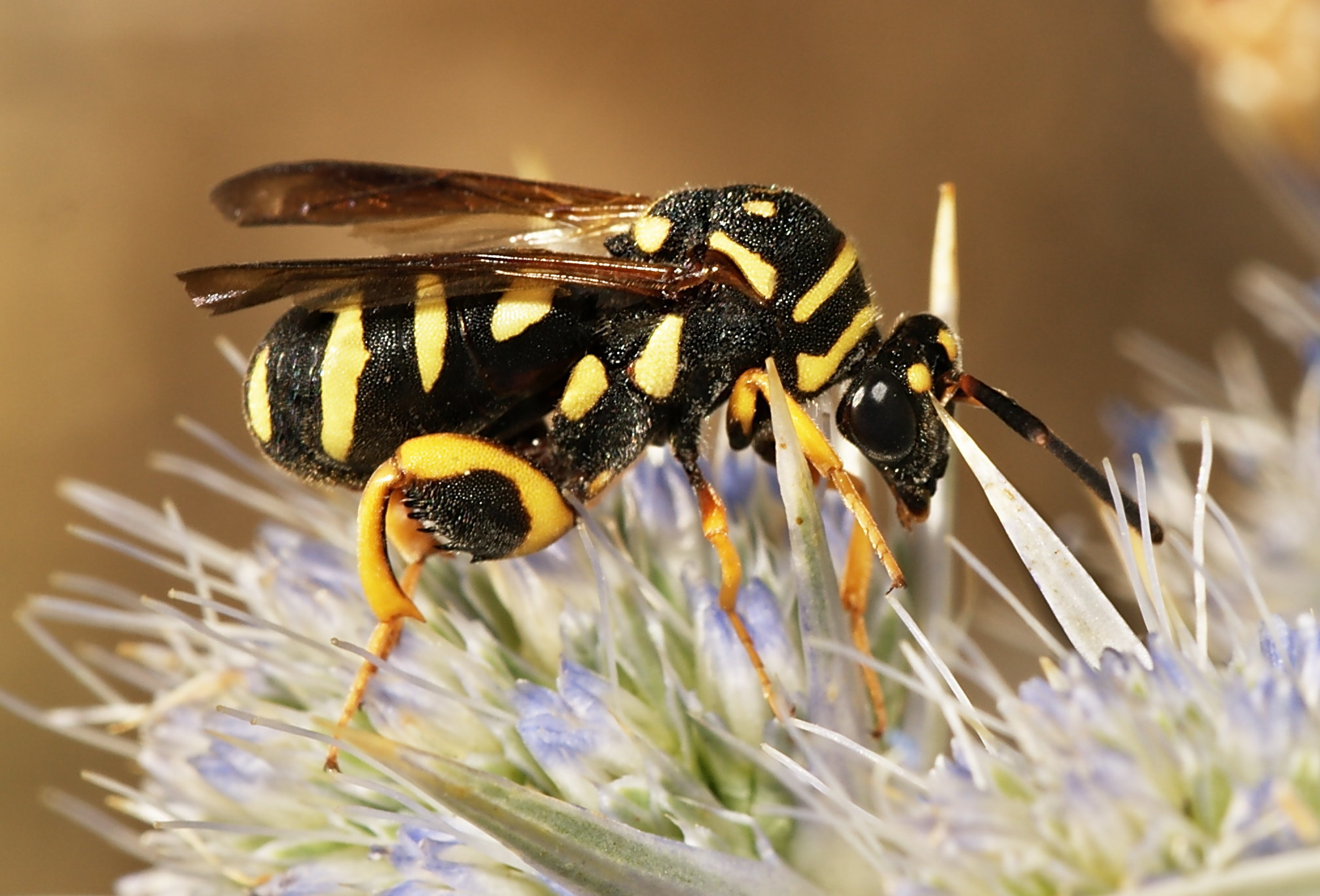
Leucospis gigas

Leucospis is a genus of wasps belonging to the family Leucospidae. Most species are brightly coloured with yellow and black patterning and about 2 cm long. They have characteristically enlarged femurs on the hind leg, with the lower margin toothed. The wings have a longitudinal fold and the long ovipositor is bent over their backs above the abdomen or metasoma. They are parasitic on wasps and solitary bees that construct cells and provision food for their offspring. The Leucospis larvae live and grow as ectoparasites of the host larvae. Usually, only one parasite emerges from a single cell. The genus Micrapion from South Africa is very closely related, and phylogenetic studies suggest merging of the two genera. The genus Leucospis is found across the world in the tropical regions.

== Species ==
Species within this genus include:

- Leucospis addenda Boucek, 1974
- Leucospis affinis Say, 1824
- Leucospis africana Cameron, 1907
- Leucospis aliena Boucek, 1974
- Leucospis anthidioides Westwood, 1874
- Leucospis antiqua Walker, 1862
- Leucospis aruina Walker, 1862
- Leucospis atriceps (Girault, 1925)
- Leucospis aurantiaca Shestakov, 1923
- Leucospis auripyga Boucek, 1974
- Leucospis australis Walker, 1871
- Leucospis azteca Cresson, 1872
- Leucospis bakeri Crawford, 1915
- Leucospis banksi Weld, 1922
- Leucospis bifasciata Klug, 1814
- Leucospis biguetina Jurine, 1807
- Leucospis bioculata Boucek, 1974
- Leucospis birkmani Brues, 1925
- Leucospis brasiliensis Boucek, 1974
- Leucospis brevicauda Fabricius, 1804
- Leucospis buchi Hedqvist, 1968
- Leucospis bulbiventris Cresson, 1872
- Leucospis calligastri (Ferrière, 1938)
- Leucospis carinifera Kriechbaumer, 1894
- Leucospis cayennensis Westwood, 1839
- Leucospis clavigaster Boucek, 1974
- Leucospis colombiana Boucek, 1974
- Leucospis conicus (Schrank, 1802)
- Leucospis coxalis Kirby, 1885
- Leucospis darjilingensis Mani, 1937
- Leucospis desantisi Boucek, 1974
- Leucospis dorsigera Fabricius, 1775
- Leucospis egaia Walker, 1862
- Leucospis elegans Klug, 1834
- Leucospis enderleini Ashmead, 1904
- Leucospis fallax Boucek, 1974
- Leucospis femoricincta Boucek, 1974
- Leucospis fuelleborniana Enderlein, 1903
- Leucospis funerea Schletterer, 1890
- Leucospis genalis Boucek, 1974
- Leucospis gigas Fabricius, 1793
- Leucospis giraulti Boucek, 1974
- Leucospis glaesaria Engel, 2002
- Leucospis globigera Boucek, 1974
- Leucospis guzeratensis Westwood, 1839
- Leucospis histrio Maindron, 1878
- Leucospis holubi Boucek, 1974
- Leucospis hopei Westwood, 1834
- Leucospis ignota Walker, 1862
- Leucospis imitans Boucek, 1974
- Leucospis incarnata Westwood, 1839
- Leucospis insularis Kirby, 1900
- Leucospis intermedia Illiger, 1807
- Leucospis japonica Walker, 1871
- Leucospis klugii Westwood, 1839
- Leucospis lankana Boucek & Narendran, 1981
- Leucospis latifrons Schletterer, 1890
- Leucospis leptomera Boucek, 1974
- Leucospis leucotelus Walker, 1852
- Leucospis mackerrasi Naumann, 1981
- Leucospis maculata Weld, 1922
- Leucospis malaica Schletterer, 1890
- Leucospis manaica Roman, 1920
- Leucospis metatibialis Boucek, 1974
- Leucospis mexicana Walker, 1862
- Leucospis micrura Schletterer, 1890
- Leucospis miniata Klug, 1834
- Leucospis moleyrei Maindron, 1878
- Leucospis morawitzi Schletterer, 1890
- Leucospis nambui Habu, 1977
- Leucospis namibica Boucek, 1974
- Leucospis nigerrima Kohl, 1908
- Leucospis nigripyga Boucek, 1974
- Leucospis niticoxa Boucek, 1974
- Leucospis obsoleta Klug, 1834
- Leucospis opalescens Weld, 1922
- Leucospis ornata Westwood, 1839
- Leucospis osmiae Boucek, 1974
- Leucospis parvula Boucek, 1974
- Leucospis pediculata Guérin-Méneville, 1844
- Leucospis petiolata Fabricius, 1787
- Leucospis pictipyga Boucek, 1974
- Leucospis pinna Grissell & Cameron, 2002
- Leucospis poeyi Guérin-Méneville, 1844
- Leucospis procera Schletterer, 1890
- Leucospis propinqua Schletterer, 1890
- Leucospis pubescens Boucek, 1974
- Leucospis pulchella Crawford, 1915
- Leucospis pulcherrima Nagase, 2007
- Leucospis pulchriceps Cameron, 1909
- Leucospis pyriformis (Weld, 1922)
- Leucospis regalis Westwood, 1874
- Leucospis reversa Boucek, 1974
- Leucospis rieki Boucek, 1974
- Leucospis rileyi Schletterer, 1890
- Leucospis robertsoni Crawford, 1909
- Leucospis robusta Weld, 1922
- Leucospis rostrata Boucek, 1974
- Leucospis santarema Walker, 1862
- Leucospis schlettereri Schulthess-Schindler, 1899
- Leucospis sedlaceki Boucek, 1974
- Leucospis signifera Boucek, 1974
- Leucospis sinensis Walker, 1862
- Leucospis slossonae Weld, 1922
- Leucospis speifera Walker, 1862
- Leucospis sumichrastii Cresson, 1872
- Leucospis texana Cresson, 1872
- Leucospis tricolor Kirby, 1883
- Leucospis vallicaucaensis Pujade-Villar & Caicedo, 2010
- Leucospis vanharteni Schmid-Egger, 2010
- Leucospis varicollis Cameron, 1909
- Leucospis ventricosa Boucek, 1974
- Leucospis versicolor Boucek, 1974
- Leucospis violaceipennis Strand, 1911
- Leucospis viridis Vago & Pauly, 2003
- Leucospis williamsi Boucek, 1974
- Leucospis xylocopae Burks, 1961
- Leucospis yasumatsui Habu, 1961
