= Megachile rufitarsis =

Scientific classification
- Domain: Eukaryota
- Kingdom: Animalia
- Phylum: Arthropoda
- Class: Insecta
- Order: Hymenoptera
- Family: Megachilidae
- Genus: Megachile
- Species: M. rufitarsis

Binomial name
- Megachile rufitarsis (Lepeletier, 1841)

Species of leafcutter bee (Megachile)

Megachile rufitarsis is a species of bee in the family Megachilidae. It was described by Amédée Louis Michel Lepeletier in 1841.
