= Megachile kashmirensis =

Scientific classification
- Domain: Eukaryota
- Kingdom: Animalia
- Phylum: Arthropoda
- Class: Insecta
- Order: Hymenoptera
- Family: Megachilidae
- Genus: Megachile
- Species: M. kashmirensis

Binomial name
- Megachile kashmirensis (Tkalcu, 1988)

Species of leafcutter bee (Megachile)

Megachile kashmirensis is a species of bee in the family Megachilidae. It was described by Tkalcu in 1988.
