= Megachile difficilis =

Scientific classification
- Domain: Eukaryota
- Kingdom: Animalia
- Phylum: Arthropoda
- Class: Insecta
- Order: Hymenoptera
- Family: Megachilidae
- Genus: Megachile
- Species: M. difficilis

Binomial name
- Megachile difficilis Morawitz, 1875

Species of leafcutter bee (Megachile)

Megachile difficilis is a species of bee in the family Megachilidae.
