= Megachile hungarica =

Scientific classification
- Domain: Eukaryota
- Kingdom: Animalia
- Phylum: Arthropoda
- Class: Insecta
- Order: Hymenoptera
- Family: Megachilidae
- Genus: Megachile
- Species: M. hungarica

Binomial name
- Megachile hungarica (Mocsáry, 1877)

Species of leafcutter bee (Megachile)

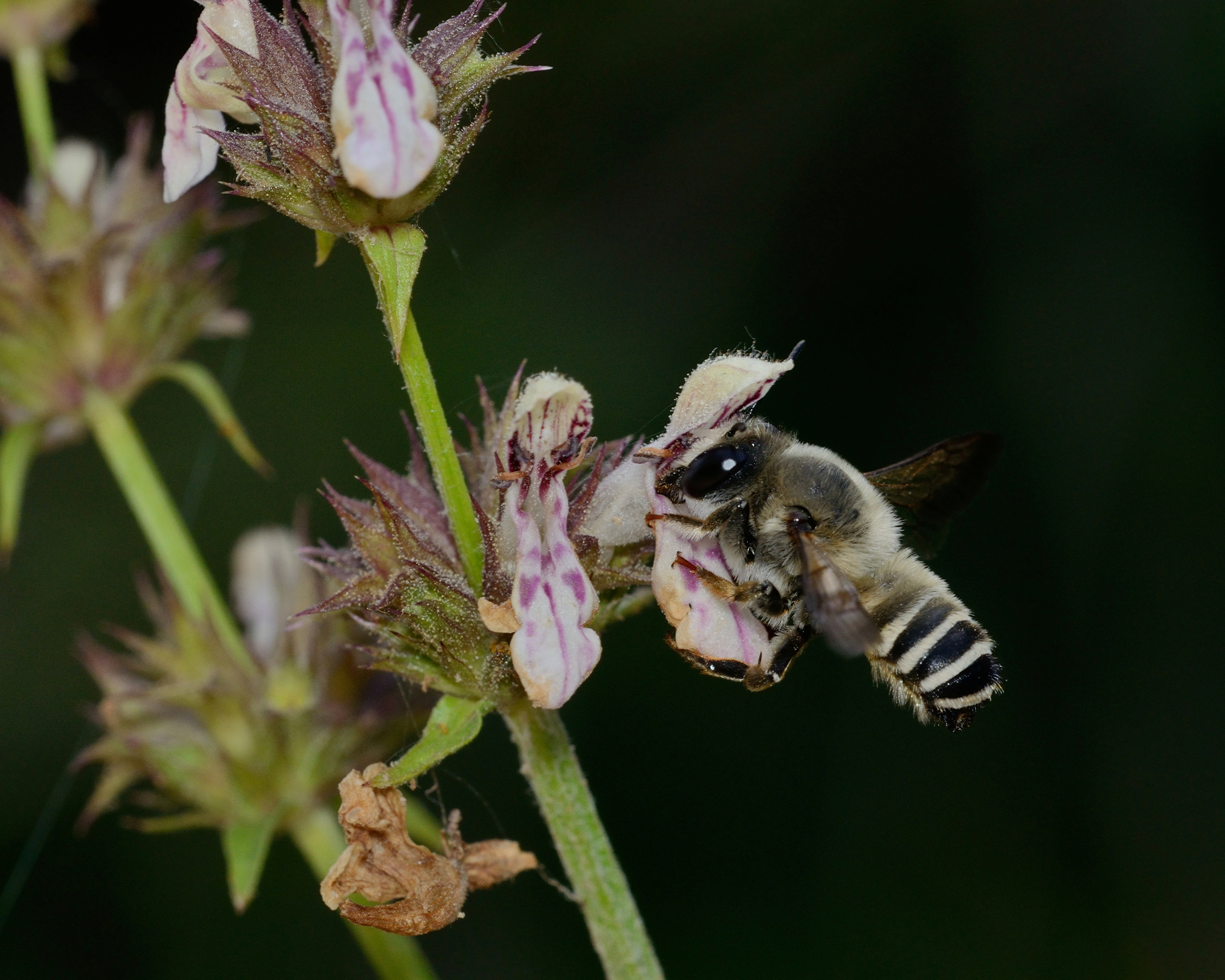
Megachile hungarica male

Megachile hungarica is a species of bee in the family Megachilidae. It was described by Mocsáry in 1877.
