= Megachile mongoliae =

Scientific classification
- Kingdom: Animalia
- Phylum: Arthropoda
- Class: Insecta
- Order: Hymenoptera
- Family: Megachilidae
- Genus: Megachile
- Species: M. mongoliae

Binomial name
- Megachile mongoliae (Tkalcu, 1988)

Species of leafcutter bee (Megachile)

Megachile mongoliae is a species of bee in the family Megachilidae. It was described by Tkalcu in 1988. As with many Megachile bees, it is very likely solitary. Members of Megachile are commonly known as “leafcutter bees” (or more broadly “leaf-cutter / mason / resin bees”).
