= Megachile pallida =

Scientific classification
- Domain: Eukaryota
- Kingdom: Animalia
- Phylum: Arthropoda
- Class: Insecta
- Order: Hymenoptera
- Family: Megachilidae
- Genus: Megachile
- Species: M. pallida

Binomial name
- Megachile pallida Radoszkowski, 1881

Species of leafcutter bee (Megachile)

Megachile pallida is a species of bee in the family Megachilidae. It was described by Radoszkowski in 1881.
