= Megachile mauritaniae =

Scientific classification
- Kingdom: Animalia
- Phylum: Arthropoda
- Clade: Pancrustacea
- Class: Insecta
- Order: Hymenoptera
- Family: Megachilidae
- Genus: Megachile
- Species: M. mauritaniae

Binomial name
- Megachile mauritaniae (Tkalcu, 1992)

Species of leafcutter bee (Megachile)

Megachile mauritaniae is a species of bee in the family Megachilidae, the species is found in Africa
