= Megachile albonotata =

Scientific classification
- Domain: Eukaryota
- Kingdom: Animalia
- Phylum: Arthropoda
- Class: Insecta
- Order: Hymenoptera
- Family: Megachilidae
- Genus: Megachile
- Species: M. albonotata

Binomial name
- Megachile albonotata Radoszkowski, 1886

Synonyms
- Chalicodoma albonotata

Species of leafcutter bee (Megachile)

Megachile albonotata is a bee species in the genus Megachile; found notably in Spain, it is the pollinator of the orchid Ophrys × flavicans (syn. Ophrys × drumana).
