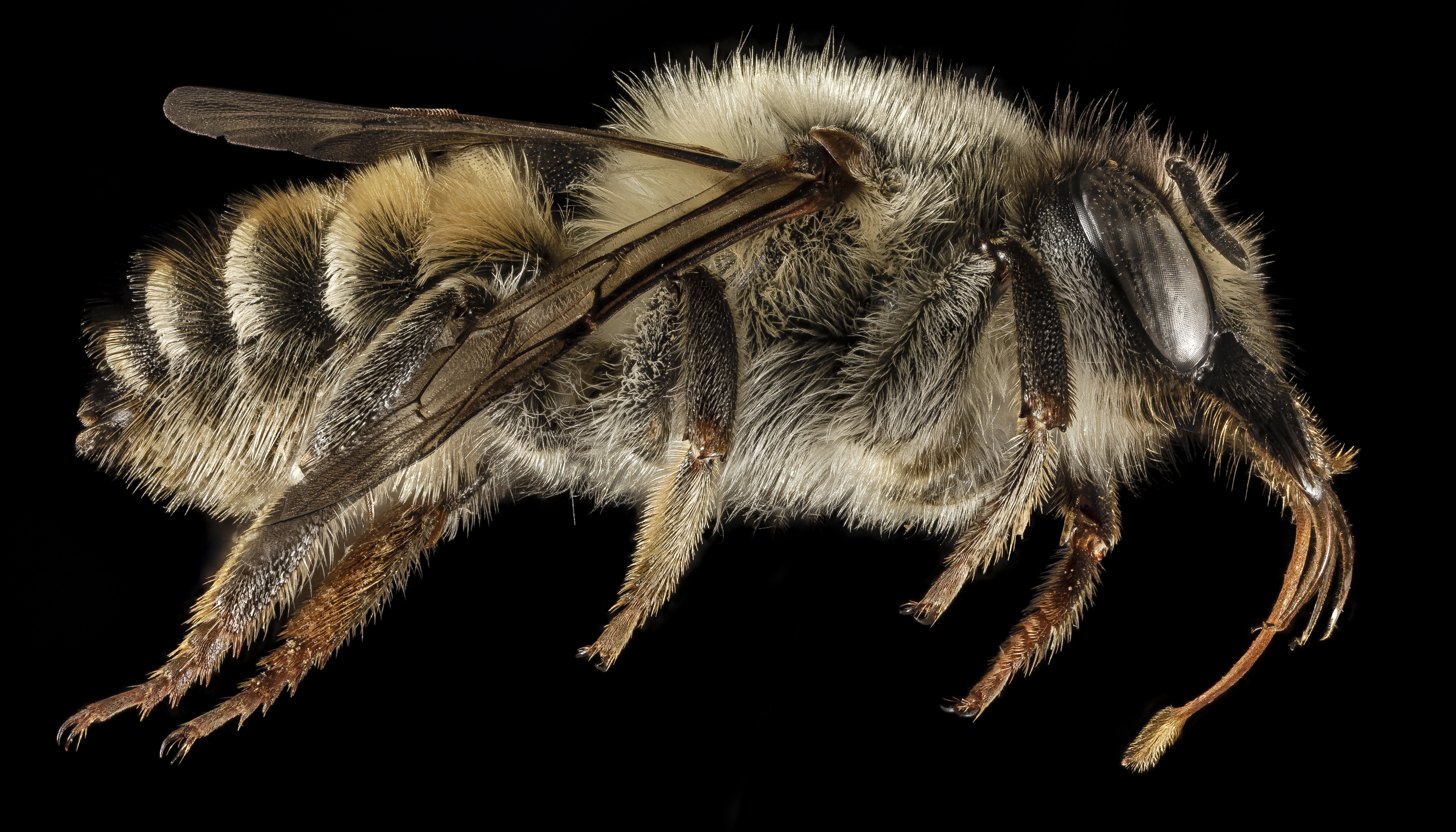

Scientific classification
- Domain: Eukaryota
- Kingdom: Animalia
- Phylum: Arthropoda
- Class: Insecta
- Order: Hymenoptera
- Family: Megachilidae
- Genus: Megachile
- Species: M. montenegrensis

Binomial name
- Megachile montenegrensis Dours, 1873

= Megachile montenegrensis =

Species of bee

Megachile montenegrensis is a species of bee in the family Megachilidae. It was described by Dours in 1873.

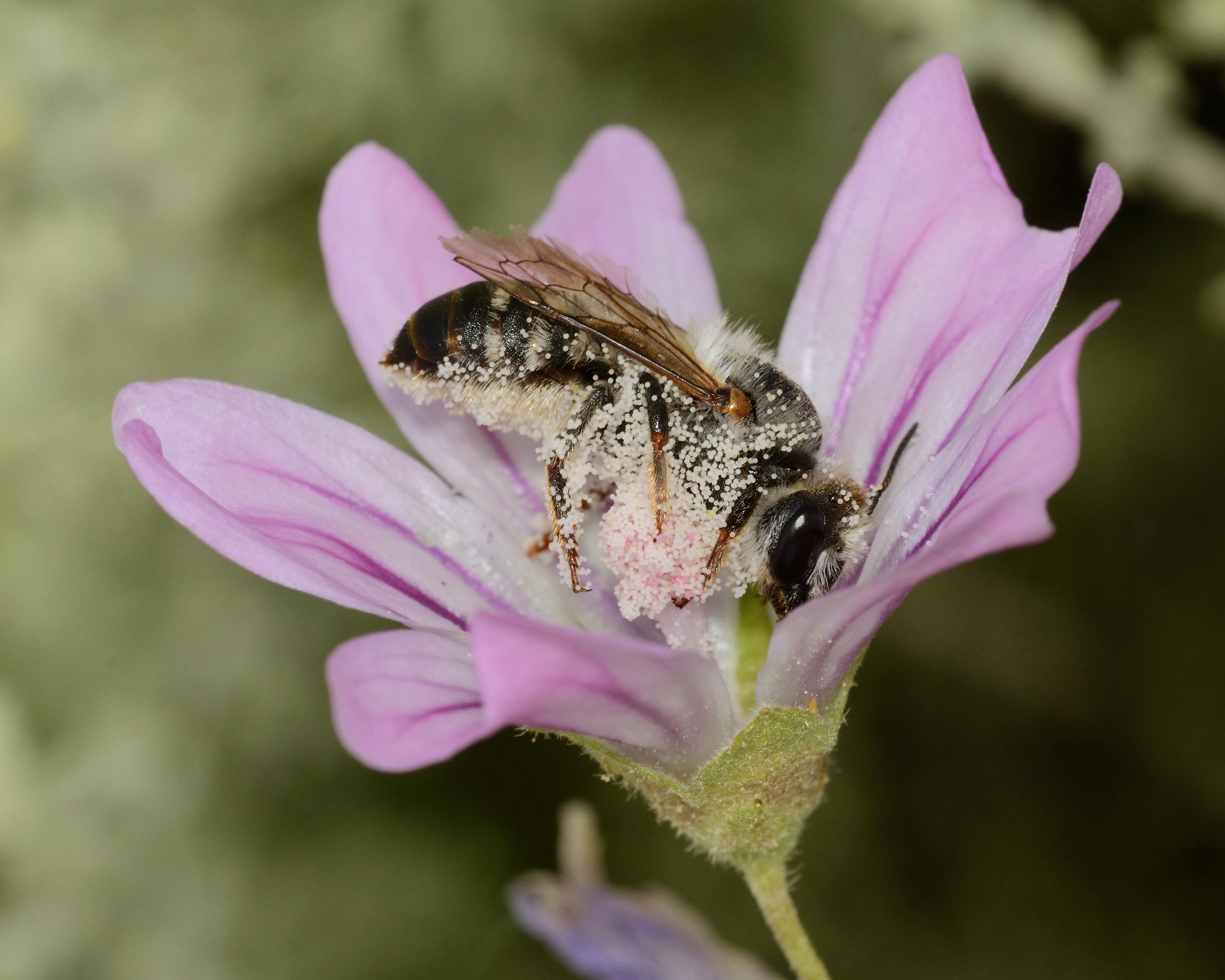
Female foraging on Malva sylvestris, Israel
