= Megachile ladakhensis =

Scientific classification
- Domain: Eukaryota
- Kingdom: Animalia
- Phylum: Arthropoda
- Class: Insecta
- Order: Hymenoptera
- Family: Megachilidae
- Genus: Megachile
- Species: M. ladakhensis

Binomial name
- Megachile ladakhensis (Tkalcu, 1988)

Species of leafcutter bee (Megachile)

Megachile ladakhensis is a species of bee in the family Megachilidae. It was described by Tkalcu in 1988.
