= Megachile wfkirbyi =

Scientific classification
- Domain: Eukaryota
- Kingdom: Animalia
- Phylum: Arthropoda
- Class: Insecta
- Order: Hymenoptera
- Family: Megachilidae
- Genus: Megachile
- Species: M. wfkirbyi

Binomial name
- Megachile wfkirbyi Kohl, 1906

Synonyms
- Megachile punctatissima Kirby, 1900 (Homonym); Megachile kirbyi Kohl, 1906 (Misspelling); Megachile grantiana Cockerell, 1907

Species of leafcutter bee (Megachile)

Megachile wfkirbyi is a species of bee in the family Megachilidae. It was described by W.F. Kirby in 1900, and renamed by Kohl in 1906.
