= Megachile apennina =

Scientific classification
- Domain: Eukaryota
- Kingdom: Animalia
- Phylum: Arthropoda
- Class: Insecta
- Order: Hymenoptera
- Family: Megachilidae
- Genus: Megachile
- Species: M. apennina

Binomial name
- Megachile apennina Benoist, 1940

Species of leafcutter bee (Megachile)

Megachile apennina is a species of bee in the family Megachilidae, described by Benoist in 1940.
