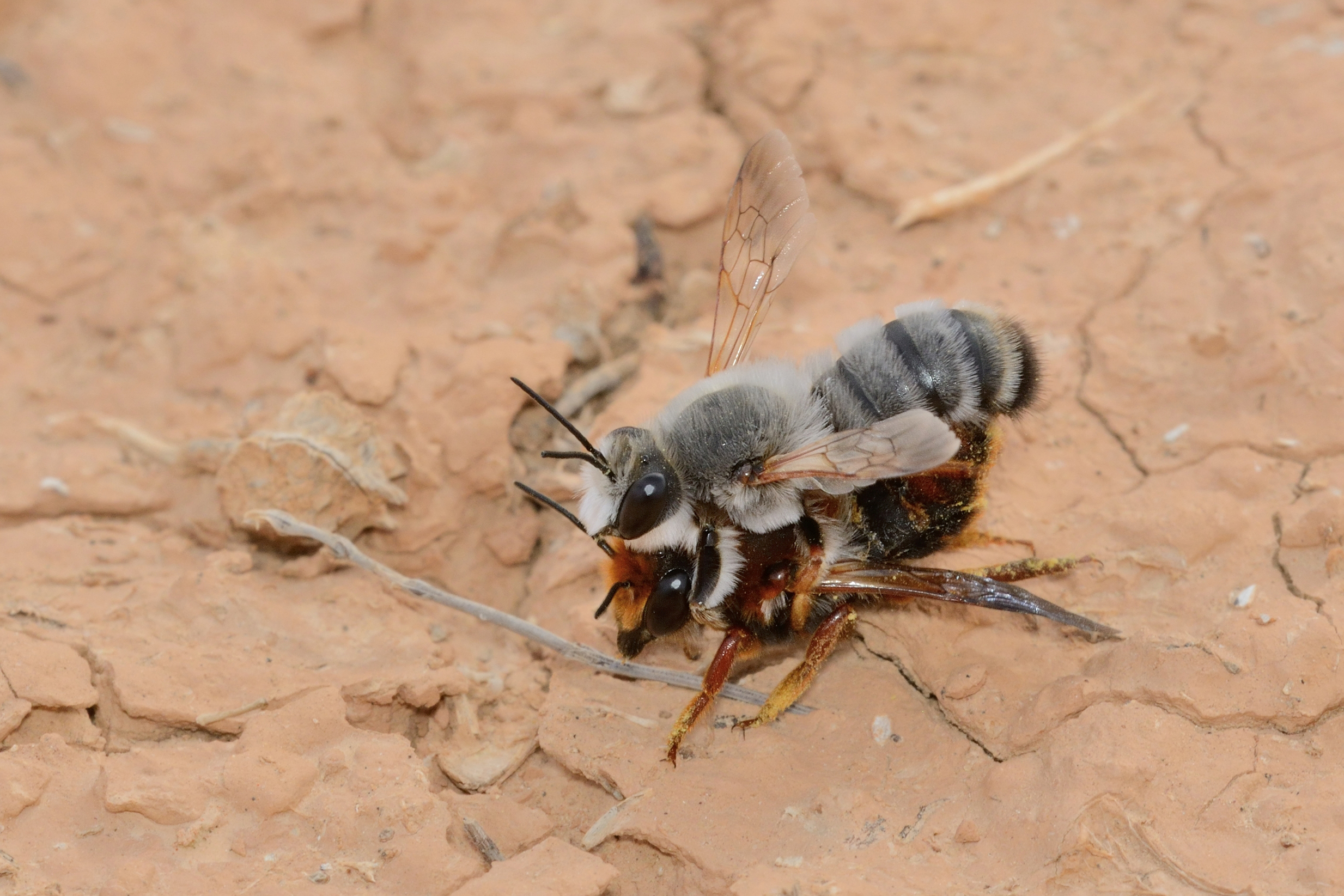

Scientific classification
- Domain: Eukaryota
- Kingdom: Animalia
- Phylum: Arthropoda
- Class: Insecta
- Order: Hymenoptera
- Family: Megachilidae
- Genus: Megachile
- Species: M. incerta

Binomial name
- Megachile incerta Radoszkowski, 1876

= Megachile incerta =

Species of leafcutter bee (Megachile)

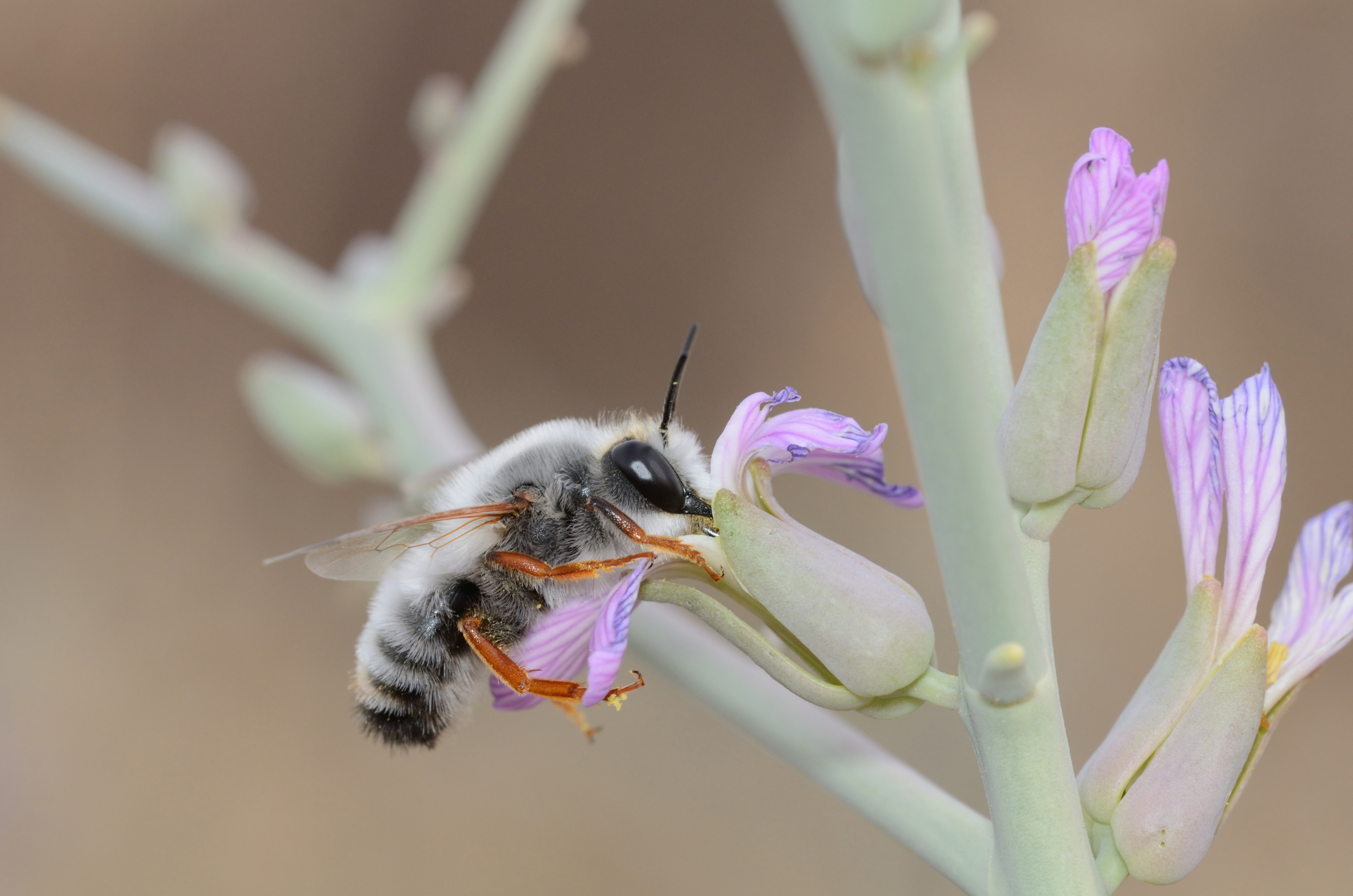
Male foraging on Zilla spinosa

Megachile incerta is a species of bee in the family Megachilidae. It was described by Radoszkowski in 1876.
