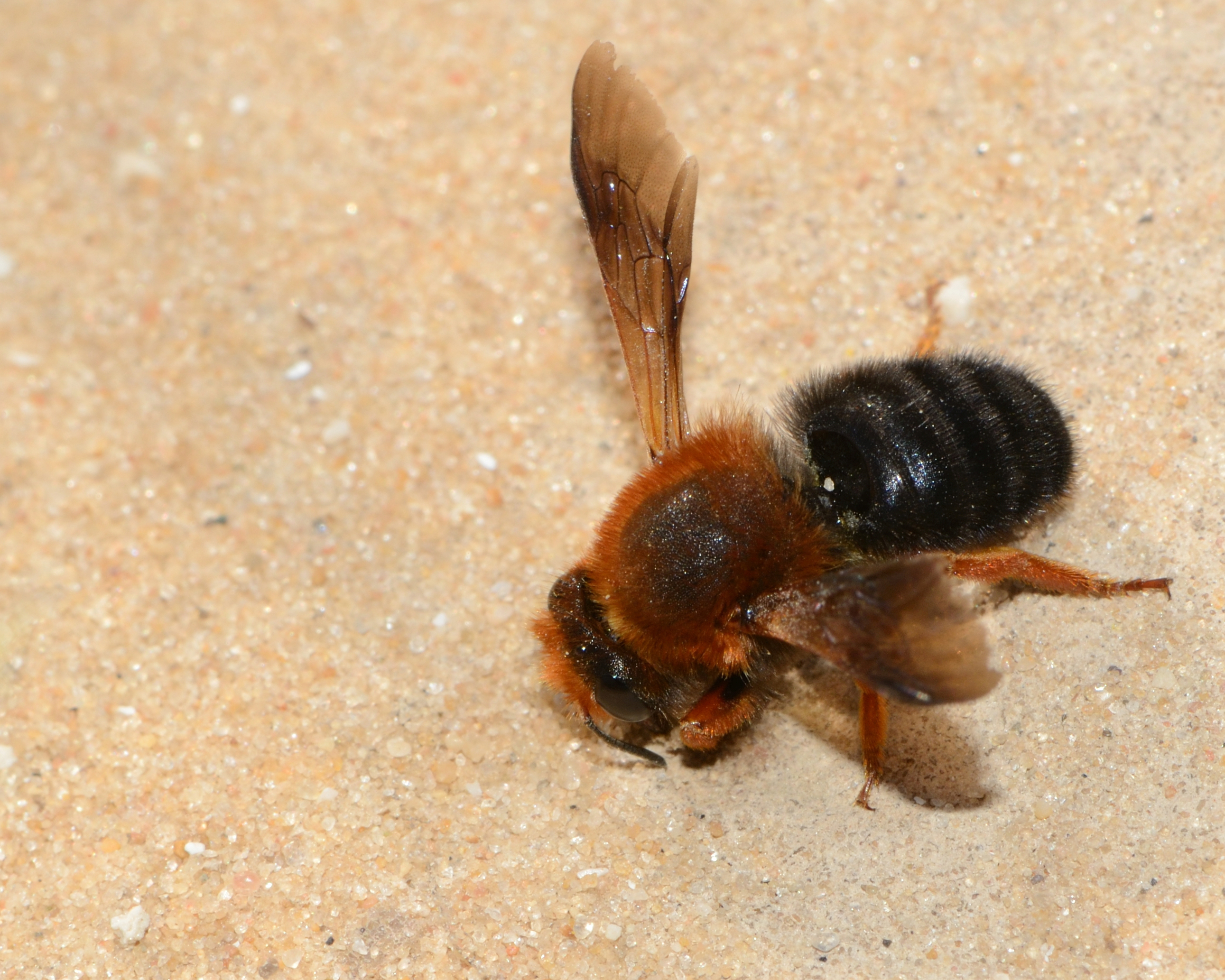

Scientific classification
- Domain: Eukaryota
- Kingdom: Animalia
- Phylum: Arthropoda
- Class: Insecta
- Order: Hymenoptera
- Family: Megachilidae
- Genus: Megachile
- Species: M. sicula

Binomial name
- Megachile sicula (Rossi, 1792)

= Megachile sicula =

Species of leafcutter bee (Megachile)

Megachile sicula is a species of bee in the family Megachilidae. It was described by Rossi in 1792.
