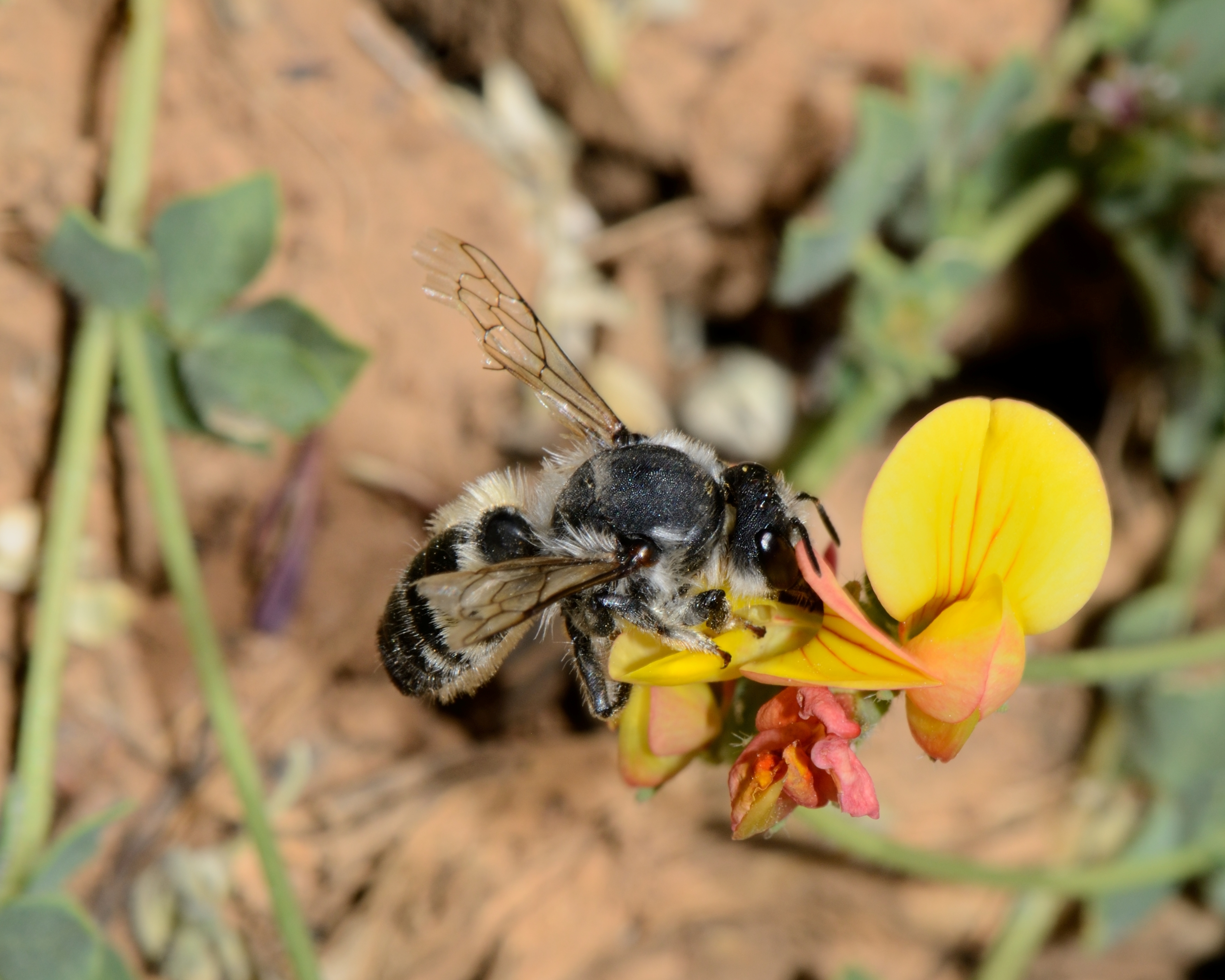
- Megachile manicata (female)

Scientific classification
- Domain: Eukaryota
- Kingdom: Animalia
- Phylum: Arthropoda
- Class: Insecta
- Order: Hymenoptera
- Family: Megachilidae
- Genus: Megachile
- Species: M. manicata

Binomial name
- Megachile manicata Giraud, 1861

= Megachile manicata =

Species of leafcutter bee (Megachile)

Megachile manicata is a species of bee in the family Megachilidae. It was described by Giraud in 1861.

It is found in the north and east Mediterranean Sea and is commonly known as the leaf cutter bee, resin bee, or mortar bee.
