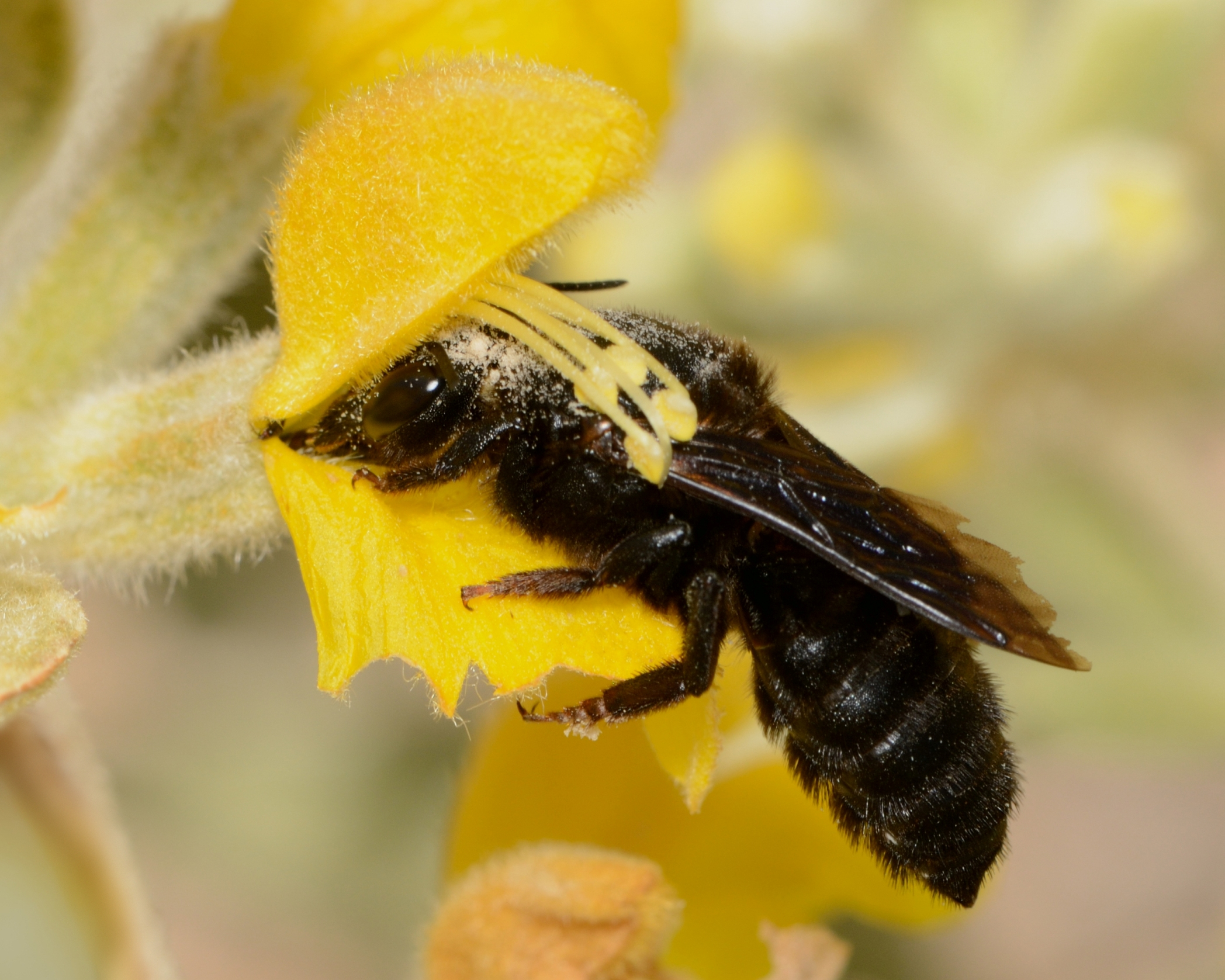

Conservation status
- Least Concern (IUCN 3.1)

Scientific classification
- Kingdom: Animalia
- Phylum: Arthropoda
- Clade: Pancrustacea
- Class: Insecta
- Order: Hymenoptera
- Family: Megachilidae
- Genus: Megachile
- Species: M. parietina

Binomial name
- Megachile parietina (Geoffroy, 1785)

= Megachile parietina =

Species of leafcutter bee (Megachile)

Megachile parietina is a species of bee in the family Megachilidae. It was described by Geoffroy in 1785. It is native to most of central Europe, as well as parts of eastern Europe.

Commonly called the black mud bee, Megachile parietina on the Maltese Islands was described by Thomas Cassar in 2024. Cassar recorded, for the first time, two adult nesting females and four nests in Pembroke, northeast of Malta.

A previous study suggested Megachile parientina could be a suitable pollinator of the orchid Ophrys meitensis, endemic to the Maltese Islands.
