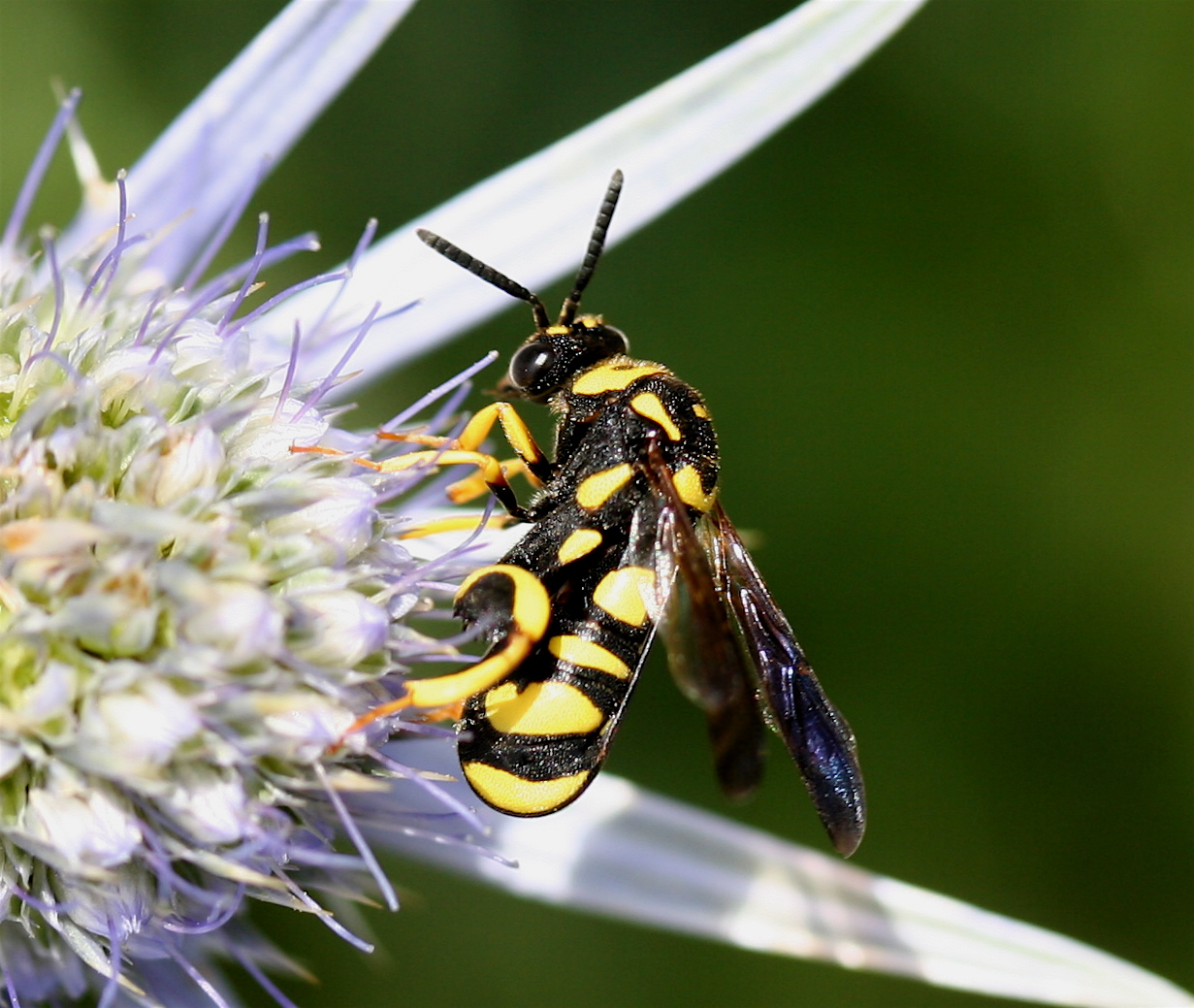
- Leucospis sp.

Scientific classification
- Kingdom: Animalia
- Phylum: Arthropoda
- Class: Insecta
- Order: Hymenoptera
- Superfamily: Chalcidoidea
- Family: Leucospidae; Fabricius, 1775

Genera
- Leucospis; Micrapion; Neleucospis; Polistomorpha

Diversity
- 4 genera c.135 species

= Leucospidae =

Leucospidae Temporal range: Miocene–Present

Group of wasps

The Leucospidae (sometimes incorrectly spelled Leucospididae) are a specialized group of wasps within the superfamily Chalcidoidea, that are ectoparasitoids of aculeate wasps or bees. They are typically mimics of bees or stinging wasps, often black with yellow, red, or white markings, sometimes metallic, with a robust mesosoma and very strong sculpturing. The hind femora are often greatly enlarged, with a row of teeth or serrations along the lower margin as in Chalcididae. The wing has a longitudinal fold. The female ovipositor is sometimes short, but if not, it is recurved and lies along the dorsal side of the metasoma, a unique feature. The males are also unusual, in the fusion of many of the metasomal segments to form a capsule-like "carapace".

Leucospidae are external parasitoids of larval hymenoptera, mostly solitary bees but some solitary wasps, and there is a case of a hyperparasitoid. The eggs are laid inside the nests of the host and upon hatching, they feed on the host larva. Usually only a single adult parasite emerges from a single host brood cell. Leucospis pinna, which parasitizes the orchid bee Eulaema meriana, is known to have multiple adults emerging from a single brood cell of the host. Leucopsis dorsigera is considered a hyperparasite, as it is a parasite of Xorides sp. which in turn is a parasitoid of a cerambycid beetle larva boring inside the stems of apricots. Leucospids are rarely encountered except in areas where their hosts are abundant; in the United States, the best-known species is Leucospis affinis, which parasitizes leafcutter bees.

There are four genera with about 130 species which are known, of which nearly 44 are from the New World, mostly from the Neotropics. A fossil species Leucospis glaesaria has been described from Early Miocene amber from the Dominican Republic. The Leucospidae have traditionally been suggested as a sister group of the Chalcididae, based on morphology, but a 2011 phylogenetic analysis found that the Leucospidae were a monophyletic lineage but with uncertain placement within the Chalcidoidea and not closely related to the Chalcididae. The study found that the genus Oodera (Pteromalidae: Cleonyminae) was close to the Leucospidae, a result confirmed by a 2018 study.
