= Johann Dietrich Alfken =

German entomologist (1862–1945)

Johann Dietrich Alfken (11 June 1862 in Frankfurt – 14 February 1945 in Ruttersdorf) was a German entomologist who specialised in Hymenoptera especially Apoidea.

His collection is shared between the Museum für Naturkunde in Berlin and the Naturkundemuseum Erfurt.

== Partial list of publications ==
- (1902) Die nordwestdeutschen Prosopis-Arten. (Hym.). Zeitschrift Für Systematische Hymenopterologie Und Dipterologie, 2(2):65-91. https://www.biodiversitylibrary.org/page/13367899
- (1902) Nachträgliche Notiz zu dem Artikel über die Prosopis - Arten. Zeitschrift Für Systematische Hymenopterologie Und Dipterologie, 2(2):109. https://www.biodiversitylibrary.org/page/13367945
- (1902) Zur Kenntnis der Prosopis annularis K. (= (dilatata K.)-Gruppe. (Hym.). Zeitschrift Für Systematische Hymenopterologie Und Dipterologie, 2(4):193-195. https://www.biodiversitylibrary.org/page/13368037
- (1903) Beitrag zur Insectenfauna der Hawaiischen und Neuseenländischen Inseln. (Ergebnisse einer Reise nach dem Pacific.) Schauinsland 1896–1897. Zoologische Jahrbücher, Abteilung für Systematik, Geographie und Biologie der Thiere, 19:561-628. https://www.biodiversitylibrary.org/page/10194235
- (1903) Zwei neue Bienen aus Japan. (Hym.). Zeitschrift Für Systematische Hymenopterologie Und Dipterologie, 3(4):209-211. https://www.biodiversitylibrary.org/page/13746769
- (1903) Zur Kenntnis einiger Centris-Arten. Zeitschrift Für Systematische Hymenopterologie Und Dipterologie, 3(4):211-213. https://www.biodiversitylibrary.org/page/13746771
- (1904) Beitrag zur Synonymie der Apiden. (Hym.). Zeitschrift Für Systematische Hymenopterologie Und Dipterologie, 4(1):1-3. https://www.biodiversitylibrary.org/page/13746991
- (1904) Ueber die von Brullé autgestellten griechischen Andrena-Arten. (Hym.). Zeitschrift Für Systematische Hymenopterologie Und Dipterologie, 4(5):289-295. https://www.biodiversitylibrary.org/page/13747313
- (1904) Andrena curvungula Thoms. und A. Pandellei (Pér.) Saund. (Hym.). Zeitschrift Für Systematische Hymenopterologie Und Dipterologie, 4(6):320-321. https://www.biodiversitylibrary.org/page/13747348
- (1904) Neue palaearktische Prosopis-Arten und -Varietäten. (Hymn.). Zeitschrift Für Systematische Hymenopterologie Und Dipterologie, 4(6):322-327. https://www.biodiversitylibrary.org/page/13747350
- (1905) Melitta nigricans n. sp., eine neue deutsche Biene. (Hym.). Zeitschrift Für Systematische Hymenopterologie Und Dipterologie, 5(2):95-96. https://www.biodiversitylibrary.org/page/33765229
- (1912) Die Bienenfauna von Bremen. Abh. naturw. Ver. Bremen, 22:1-137.
