= Arauco =

Arauco, originally from Mapudungun rag ko meaning “clayey water,” or Araucanía may refer to:

== Places ==
- Araucanía Region, an administrative region of Chile, the heartland of the historic region of Araucania
- Araucanía (historic region), a historical region of Central Chile also called Arauco
- Arauco, Chile, a city and municipality in Arauco Province, Chile
- Arauco Peninsula
- Arauco Province, a province in the Biobío Region of Chile
- Arauco, La Rioja, Argentina
- Arauco Department, La Rioja, an administrative entity in La Rioja Province, Argentina
- Gulf of Arauco, a body of water on the coast of Chile
- Araucanian Islands (disambiguation)

== Biology ==
- Arauco (moth)
- Araucania chilensis (a sapygid wasp)
- Araucania (a braconid wasp genus)
- Araucaria araucana, the Arauco pine

== Other uses ==
- Celulosa Arauco y Constitución (CELCO), a wood pulp and forestry enterprise in Chile

== See also ==
- Arauco War, a centuries-long a war in Chile involving Spaniards and Mapuches
