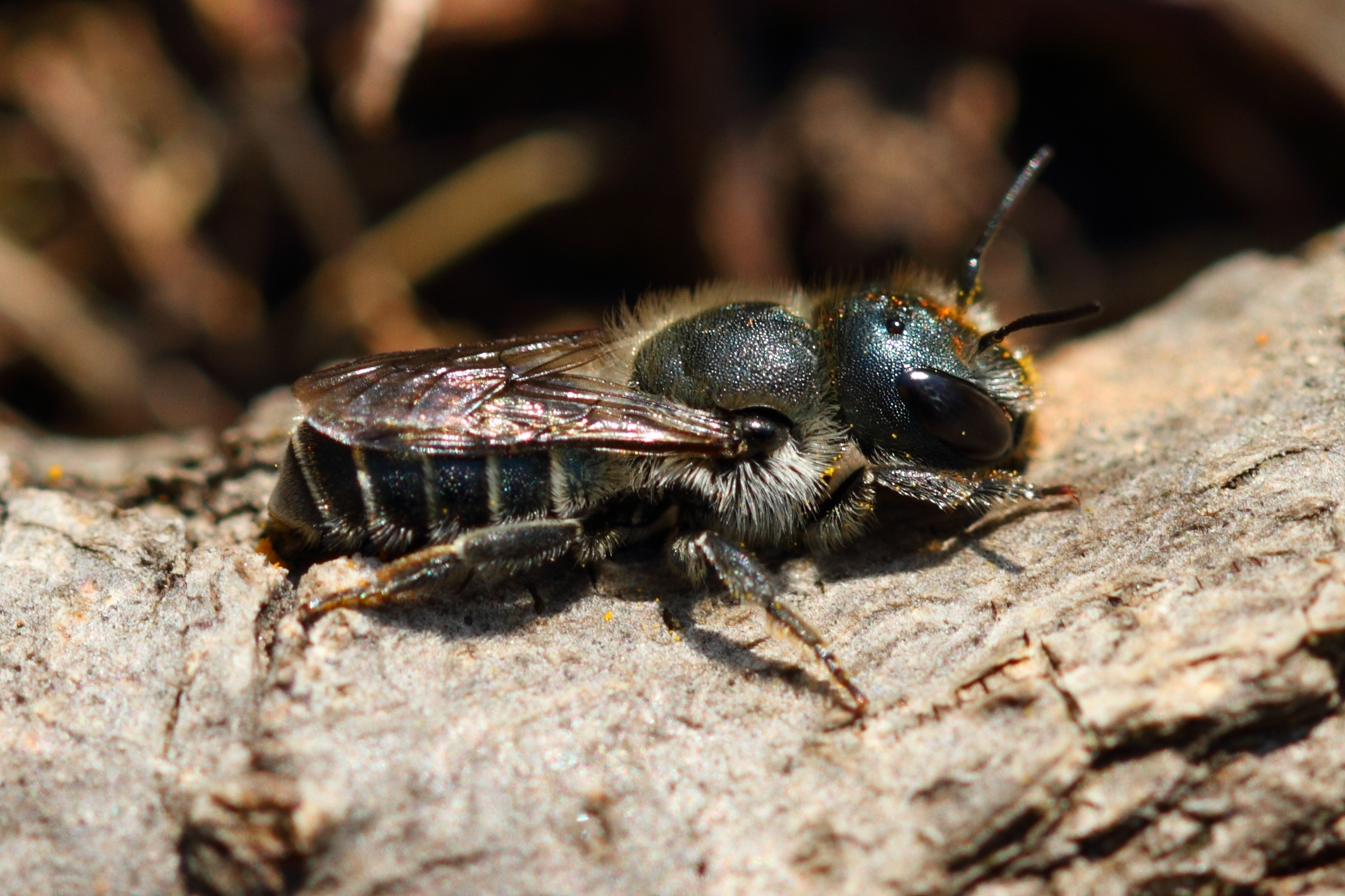
- Female

Scientific classification
- Kingdom: Animalia
- Phylum: Arthropoda
- Class: Insecta
- Order: Hymenoptera
- Family: Megachilidae
- Genus: Osmia
- Species: O. caerulescens

Binomial name
- Osmia caerulescens (Linnaeus, 1758)

Synonyms
- Apis caerulescens Linnaeus, 1758; Apis aenea Linnaeus 1758; Apis superbus Harrus 1776; Apis muraria Retzius 1783; Apis cuprea Geoffroy, 1785; Apis cyanea Fabricius 1793; Megachile cyanea (Fabricius 1793); Anthophora cyanea (Fabricius, 1793); Andrena cupraria Walckenaer 1802; Osmia purpurea Cresson 1864; Osmia rustica Cresson 1864; Osmia melanippa Spinola 1808; Osmia dutti Cockerell 1922

= Osmia caerulescens =

Species of bee

Osmia caerulescens, the blue mason bee, is a species of solitary bee from the family Megachilidae. It has a Holarctic distribution extending into the Indomalayan region, although its presence in the Nearctic may be due to human-assisted introduction.

== Description ==
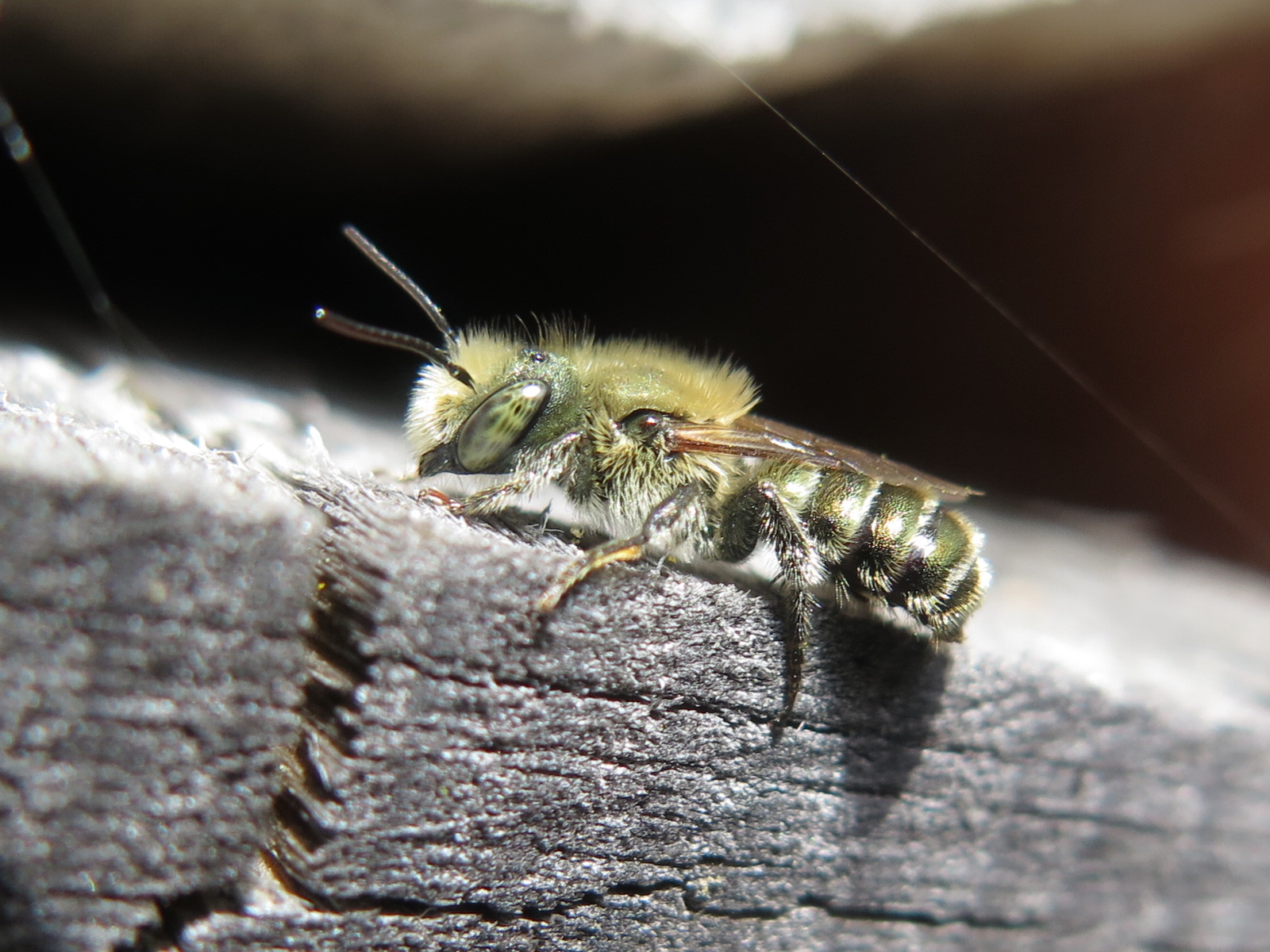
male

Females of Osmia caerulescens are 10–11 mm in length, dark blue-black in color, with a metallic sheen, and sparsely covered with brown hairs with those on the abdomen forming a narrow, dense, flattened band on the hind margin of each of the segments. The dense brush of pollen-collecting scopae on the underside of the abdomen is jet black. The males are slightly smaller, 9mm, more slender in build, distinctly metallic green and clothed with pale hairs.

== Habitat ==
O. caerulescens occurs in a wide variety of habitats, including woodland and private gardens.

== Biology ==
O. caerulescens uses a variety of pre-existing cavities for nesting, such as insect burrows in dead wood, drilled borings in wooden blocks, hollow stems, drilled borings in pithy stems, burrows created by other insects in the ground, abandoned cells in exposed nests of other aculeates, cavities in banks, holes and crevices in walls, and glass tubes. The cell partitions and the nest plug are made of masticated leaf material and sometimes chewed petals are used, as well. Any irregularities in the nest burrows are lined with leaf pulp. In larger cavities, the cells are irregularly arranged, and the cell walls are partially or wholly built of chewed leaves.

The bees winter as diapausing adults in their intact cocoons. In Great Britain and France, this bee is bivoltine and is partially so in the Netherlands The males usually emerge first and wait around the nests seeking females to mate with and are active for about three weeks. The two flight periods in Great Britain are from mid April or May to late July, and then again in August.

The bee is polylectic, but it collects pollen nearly exclusively on members of the Fabaceae. It has been observed collecting pollen from Coronilla, Hippocrepis, Lotus, Medicago, Melilotus, Onobrychis, Trifolium, and Vicia. It has also been observed to collect pollen from some members of the Lamiaceae, Asteraceae, Brassicaceae, Hypericaceae, and Ranunculaceae. The scopae of the females are used to comb pollen from the nototribic anthers of theLamiaceae and Antirrhineae.

Occupied cocoons of the sapygid wasp Sapyga quinquepunctata have been recovered from a nest of O. caerulescens and the Natural History Museum, London, has specimens of S. quinquepunctata that have been reared from the nests of O. caerulescens.

== Subspecies ==
The two recognised subspecies of O. caerulescens are:

- O. c. caerulescens (Linnaeus, 1758) is found in Europe.
- O. c. cyanea (Fabricius, 1793) is from North Africa.

== Distribution ==
O. caerulescens is mainly Palearctic and is found over most of Europe and Asia, the Middle East, and North Africa. In Great Britain, it is mainly found in England and Wales becoming more localised in the north and reaches central Scotland. It is also found in India. The occurrence of O.cearulescens in North America may be the result of introduction by humans. Its North American range is from Minnesota to Nova Scotia, south to Illinois and North Carolina.
