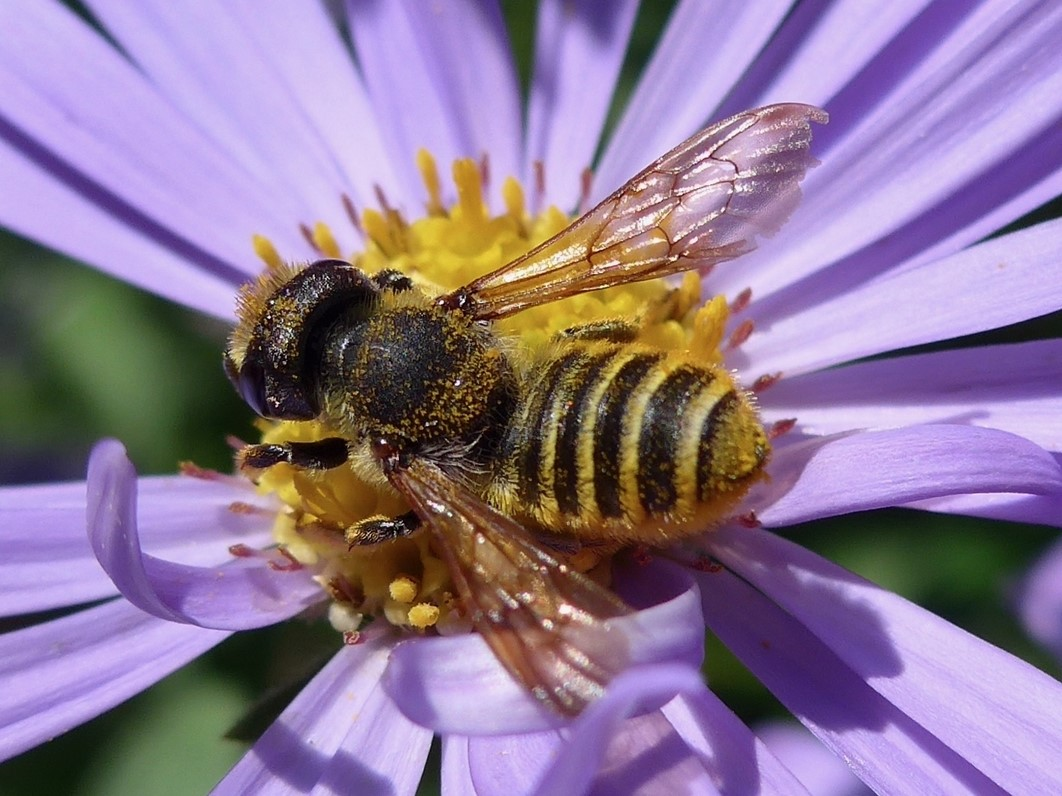

Scientific classification
- Kingdom: Animalia
- Phylum: Arthropoda
- Class: Insecta
- Order: Hymenoptera
- Family: Megachilidae
- Genus: Megachile
- Species: M. fidelis

Binomial name
- Megachile fidelis Cresson, 1878

= Megachile fidelis =

Species of leafcutter bee (Megachile)

Megachile fidelis, the faithful leafcutting bee, is a species of bee in the family Megachilidae.

This species is found in the western United States, where it ranges from Montana and South Dakota to New Mexico, west to California and north to Oregon, and often inhabits meadows and gardens. The bee is black, but covered by golden/yellow hair on its face, behind its eyes, on its thorax, below its wings (which are blackish) and on its legs. The pollen basket of the species is located under its abdomen. As often found with most bees, Megachile fidelis feeds on the nectar of flowers - particularly the nectar of composite flowers. The nests of M. fidelis are created in almost exactly the same fashion as, M. perihirta, the Western Leafcutting Bee. However, adult bees do not leave their brood cells until all the cells between their cell and the end of the tunnel have been vacated. As with the case of many bees, larva grow extremely rapidly when in their brood cells. It is often found that this species of bee leave their nests around spring.

The species was first described by Ezra Townsend Cresson in 1878.
