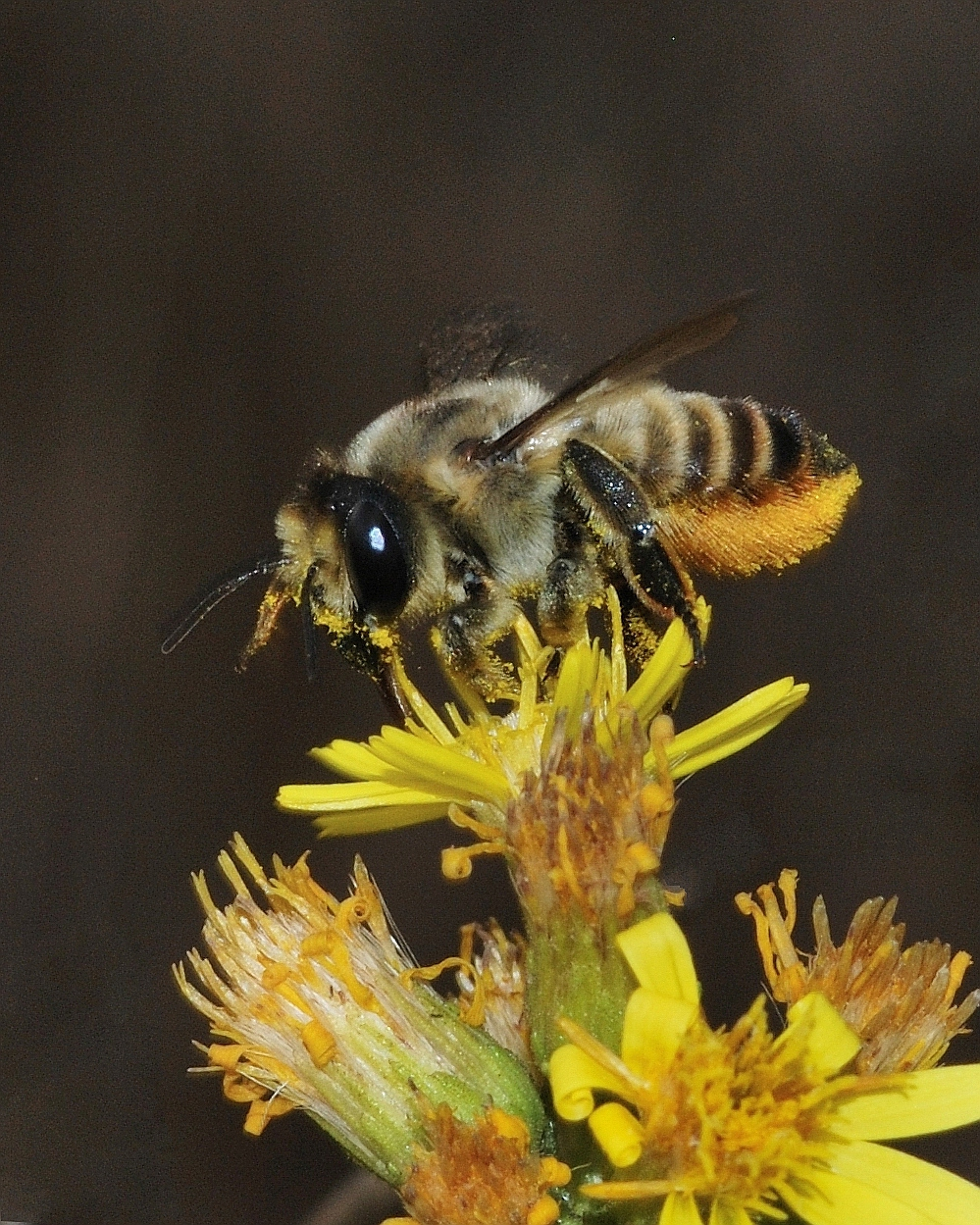
- Megachile lagopoda

Scientific classification
- Kingdom: Animalia
- Phylum: Arthropoda
- Clade: Pancrustacea
- Class: Insecta
- Order: Hymenoptera
- Family: Megachilidae
- Genus: Megachile; Latreille, 1802

Subgenera
- Over 50 subgenera and 1520 spp., see list

Synonyms
- Anthophora Fabricius, 1804 (Preocc.); Eumegachile Friese, 1898; Anthemois Robertson, 1903; Cyphopyga Robertson, 1903; Megalochila Schulz, 1906; Grosapis Mitchell, 1980

= Megachile =

Genus of bees

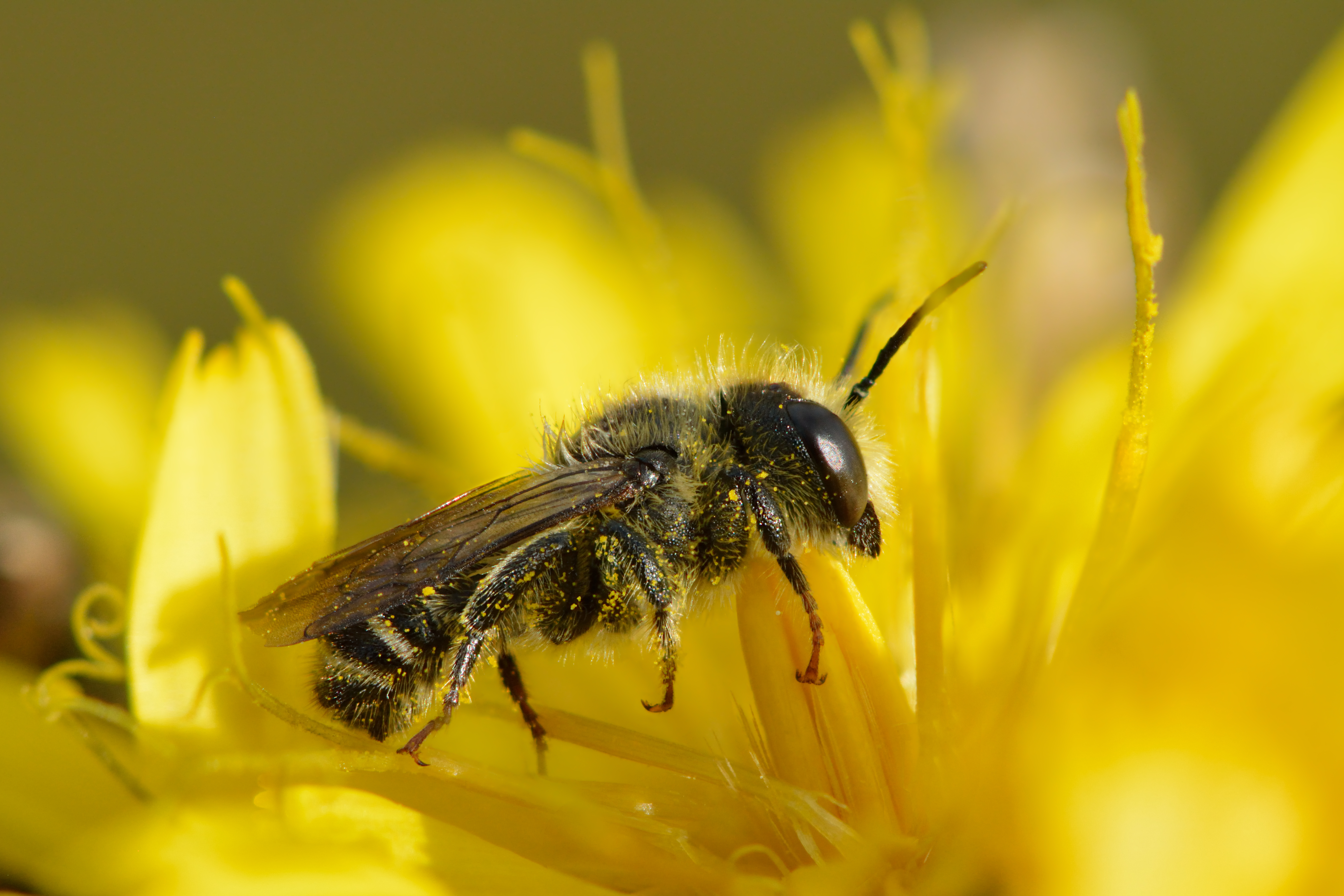
Male Megachile

The genus Megachile is a cosmopolitan group of solitary bees, often called leafcutter bees or leafcutting bees; it also includes the resin bees and mortar bees. While other genera within the family Megachilidae may chew leaves or petals into fragments to build their nests, certain species within Megachile neatly cut pieces of leaves or petals, hence their common name. This is one of the largest genera of bees, with more than 1500 species in over 50 subgenera. The alfalfa leafcutter bee (Megachile rotundata) is managed on a commercial scale for crop pollination, and has been introduced by humans to various regions around the world.

Female leafcutter bee nectaring on Great Valley gumplant. The three scenes repeated at one tenth speed.

== Ecology ==
Nests are sometimes constructed within hollow twigs or other similarly constricted natural cavities, but often are in burrows in the ground. Nests are typically composed of single long columns of cells, the cells being sequentially constructed from the deepest portion of the tunnel outwards. The female places an egg in each cell with a supply of food, generally pollen, sometimes mixed with nectar. She builds a cap and walls off the cell. The larva hatches from the egg and consumes the food supply. After moulting a few times, it spins a cocoon and pupates, often after several months of hibernation as a prepupa. It emerges from the nest as an adult. Males, which are typically smaller and emerge in advance of females, die shortly after mating, but females survive for another few weeks, during which time they build new nests. Numerous families of wasps and bees parasitize Megachile nests, including Gasteruptiidae, Leucospidae, Sapygidae, and various kleptoparasitic megachilids, such as the closely related genus Coelioxys. M. rotundata and M. campanulae are among of the first insects documented in scientific literature to use synthetic materials for making nests.

Many Megachile species use cut leaves to line the cells of their nests. It is thought that the leaf discs help prevent the desiccation of the larva's food supply. Various species in the genus, especially those in the subgenus Chalicodoma and related groups, do not use cut leaves to line the cells, but instead use fairly dry plant resin, which they carry in their mandibles. The subgenus Chalicodoma includes the world's largest bee, Megachile pluto, as well as one of the largest megachilids in the United States, the recently introduced Asian species, Megachile sculpturalis.

Some Megachile species have no lobe (arolia) between their claws, thus are unable to climb smooth walls or glass.

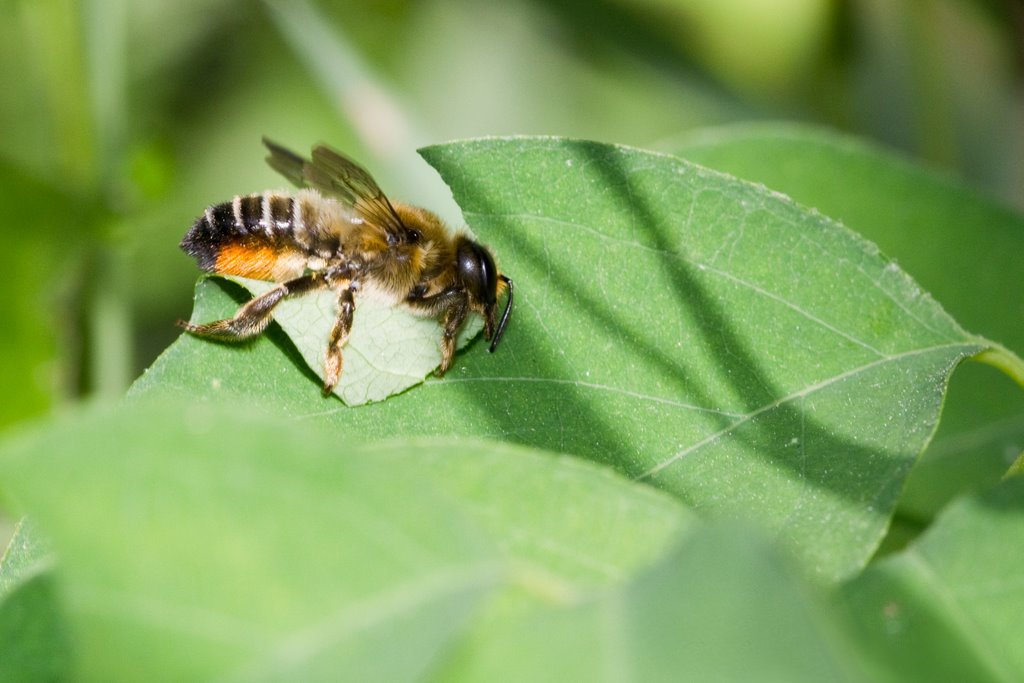
Megachile centuncularis cutting a leaf

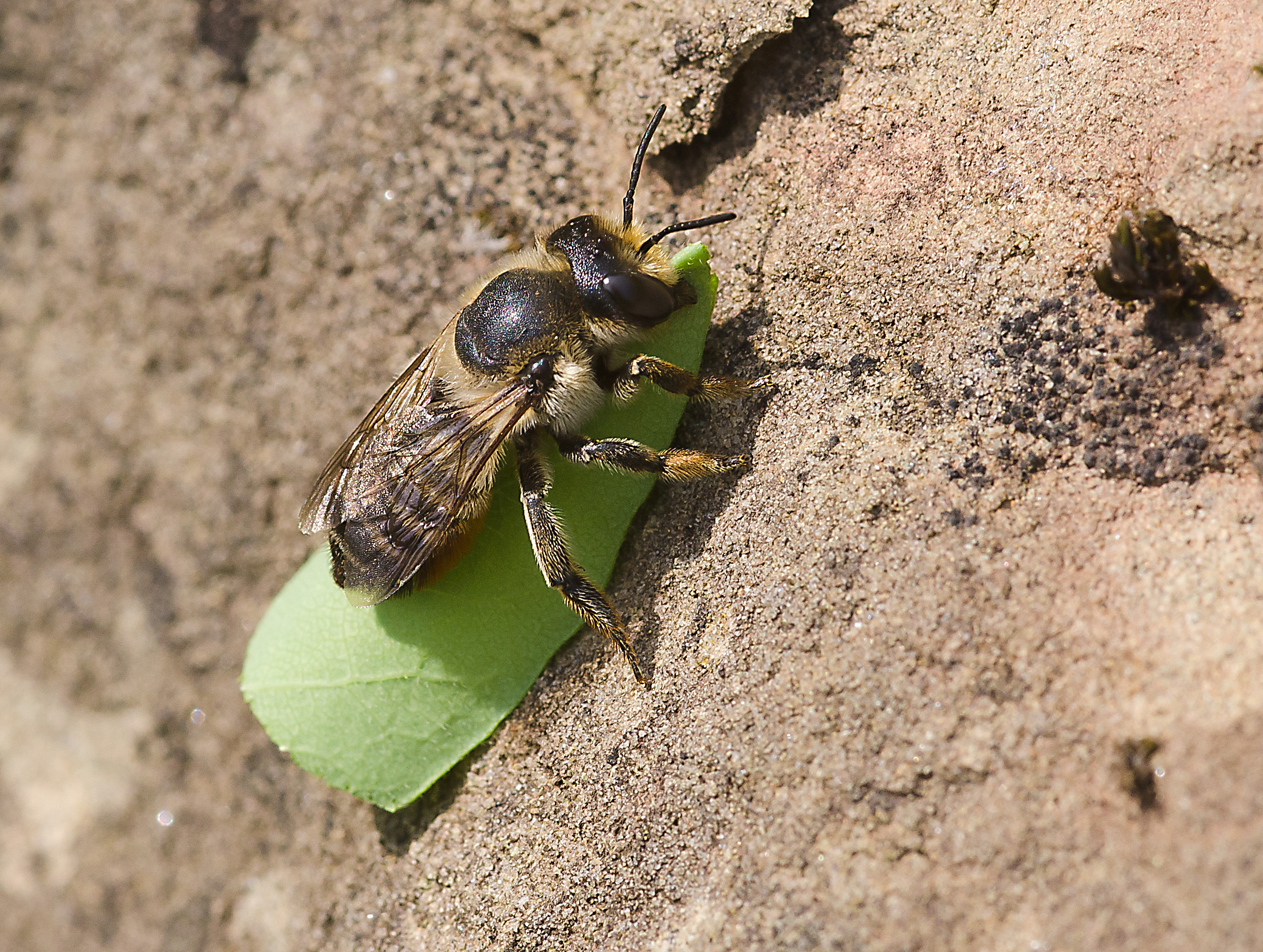
Megachile sp. with cut leaf

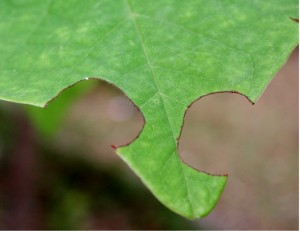
Leaves cut by Megachile sp.

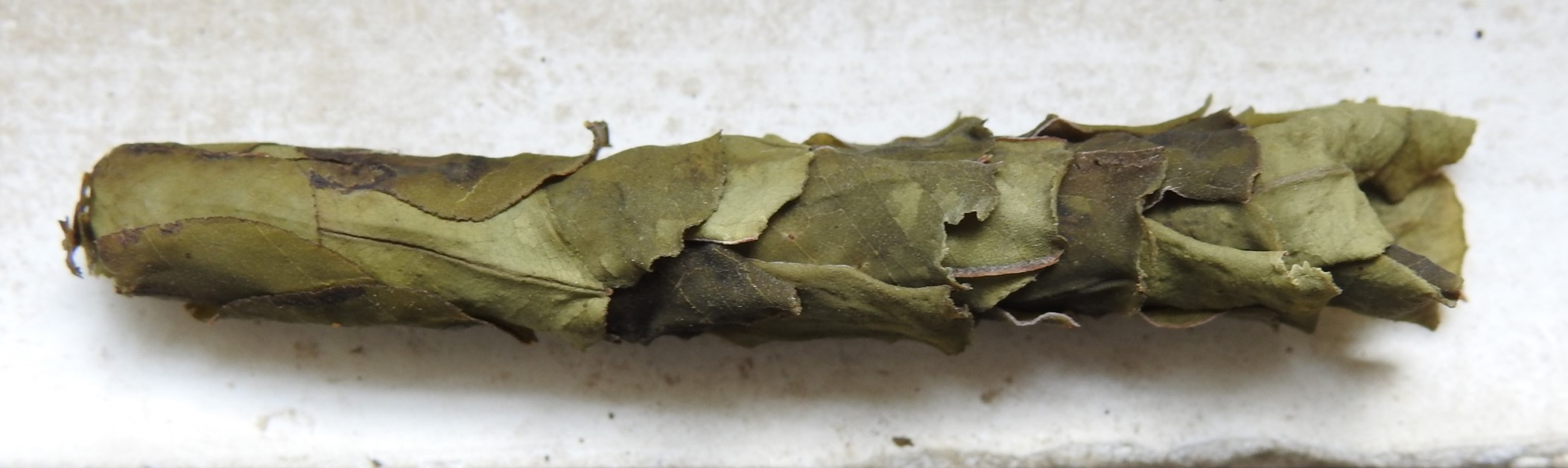
Dissected nest of a Megachile bee

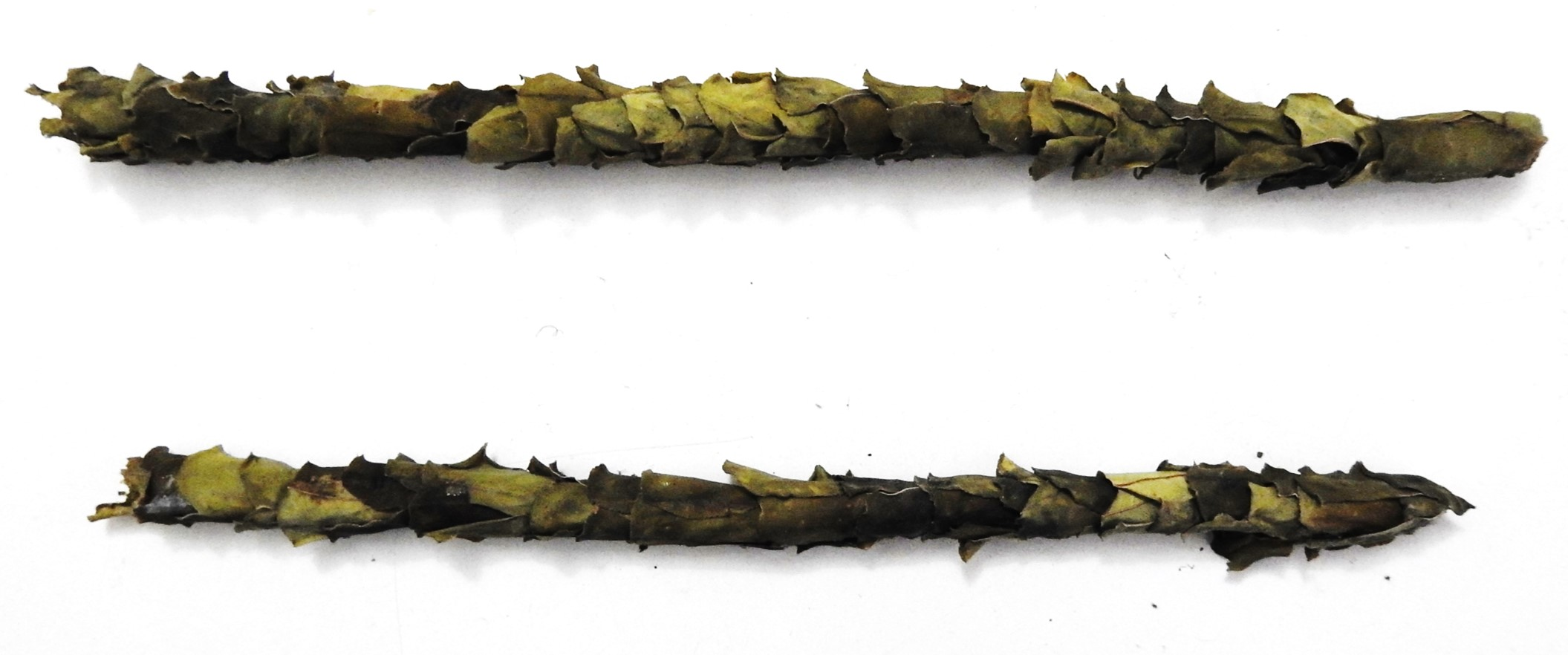
Nests of Megachile bees from Bangalore, India.

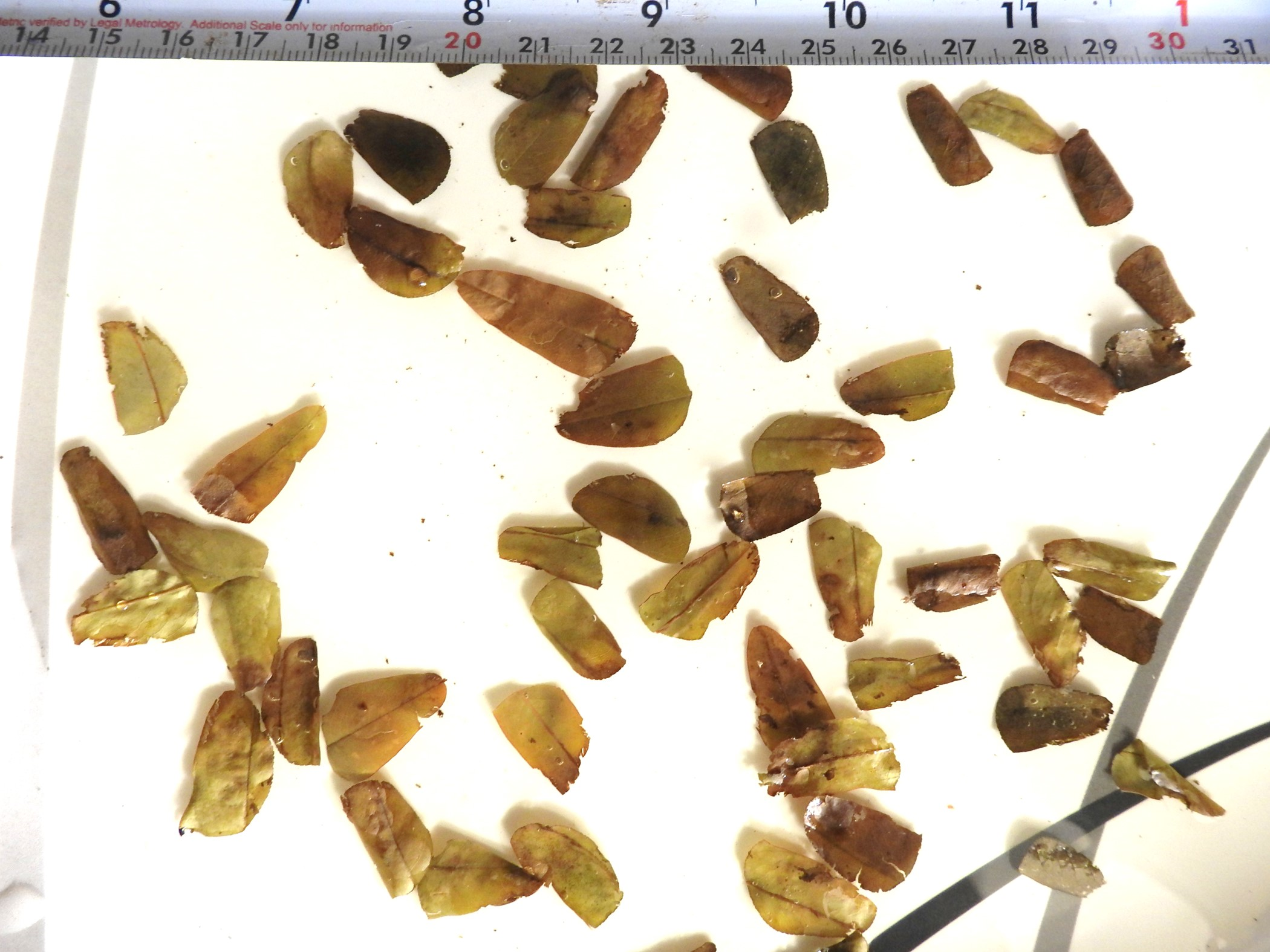
Dissected cut leaf bits from a nest.

Slow motion: female leafcutter bee flying to and from a Great Valley gumplant blossom. Notice the bee’s long tongue being withdrawn as it takes flight. 6,000 fps played at 30 fps.

Male Megachile, a leaf-cutting bee, making hovering approach to a female Megachile resting on a common sunflower. Portions repeated at one-tenth speed.

Male Megachile, leaf-cutting bees, discouraging honeybees from visiting their common sunflower perch and nectar source. Portions repeated at one-tenth and one twenty-fifth speed.

Male Megachile leaf-cutting bees on a common sunflower avoid small wasps. Some portions repeated at one tenth or one twenty-fifth speed.

Male Megachile leaf-cutting bees visiting a common sunflower. Some portions played at one tenth speed.

== Diversity ==
The genus Megachile contains 56 subgenera with 1520 recognized species. See also the list of Megachile species.

Notable subgenera:

- Callomegachile
- Chalicodoma
- Chelostomoides

Notable species:

- Megachile albisecta (Klug, 1817)
- Megachile aurifrons, red-eyed bee
- Megachile campanulae, bellflower resin bee
- Megachile erythropyga
- Megachile fidelis, faithful leafcutting bee
- Megachile nigrovittata
- Megachile perihirta, western leafcutting bee
- Megachile pluto, the largest bee in the world
- Megachile rotundata, alfalfa leafcutter bee
- Megachile rubi
- Megachile sculpturalis, giant resin bee
- Megachile texana, Texas leafcutter bee

== Gallery ==
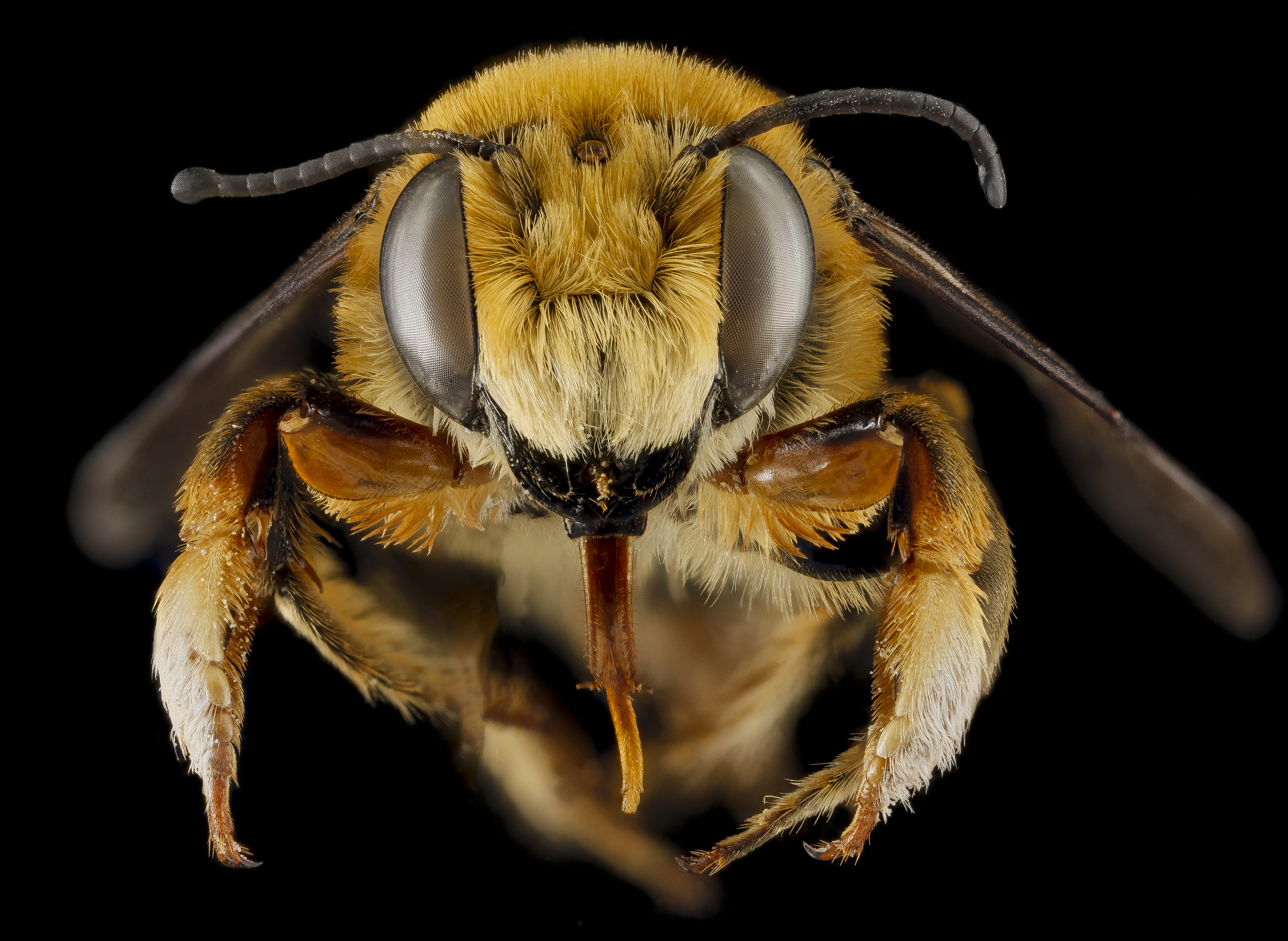
Megachile fortis

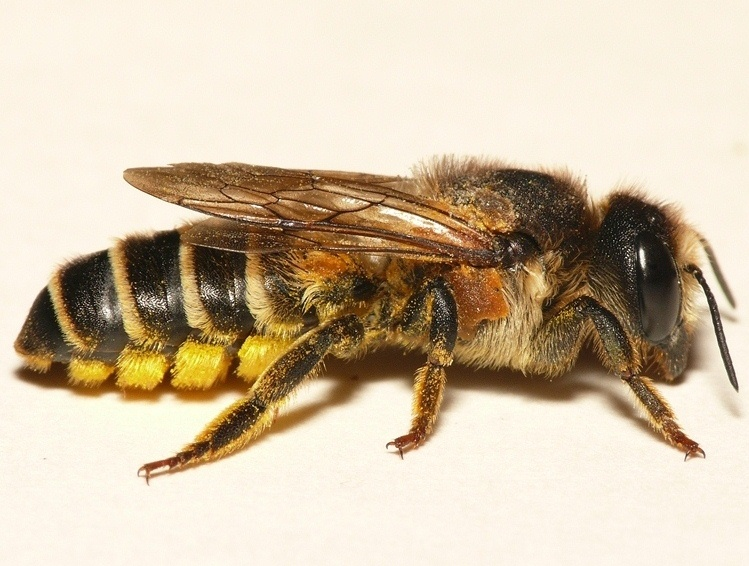
Megachile ericetorum

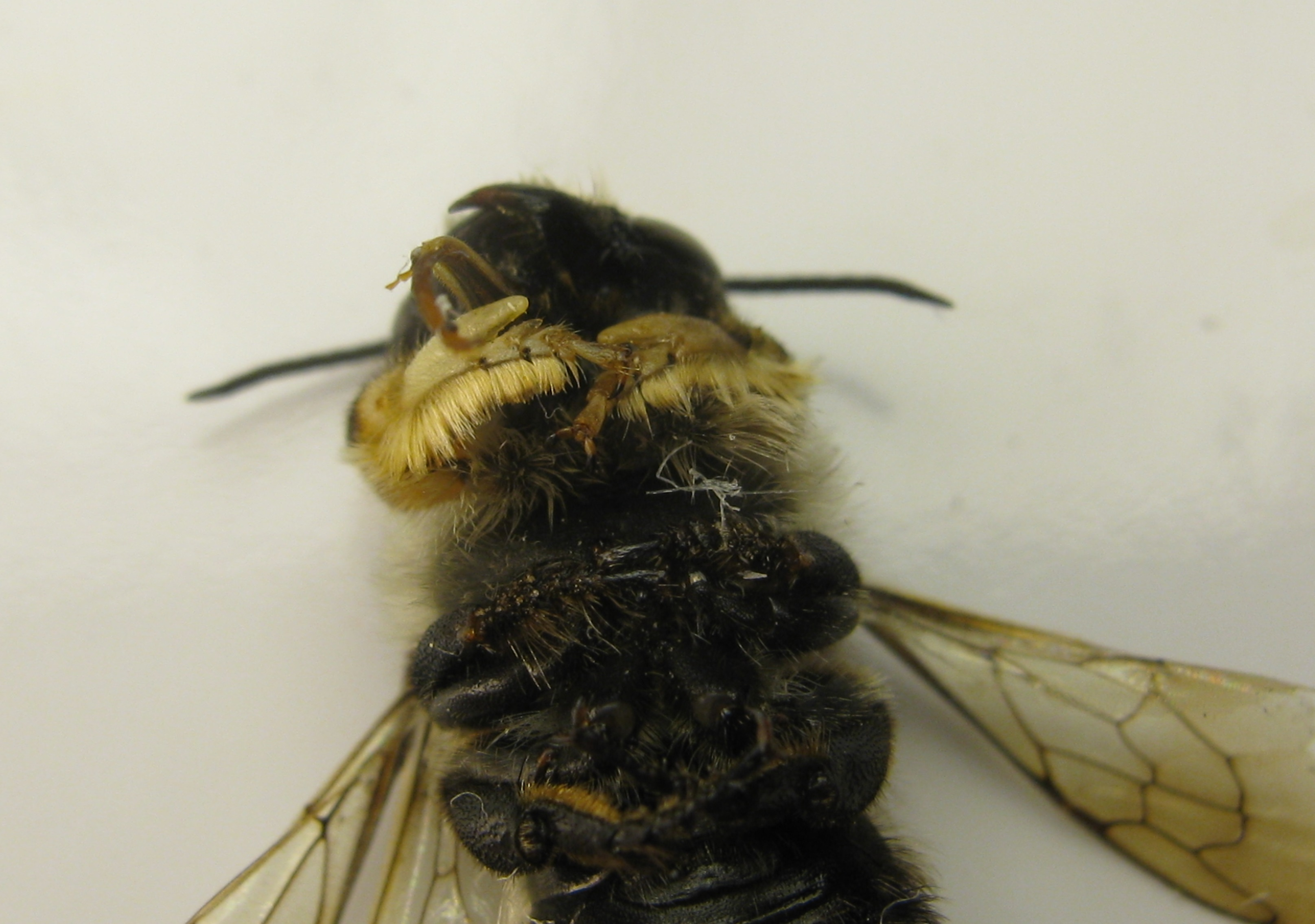
Male Megachile Subgenus Xanthosarus with modified front legs

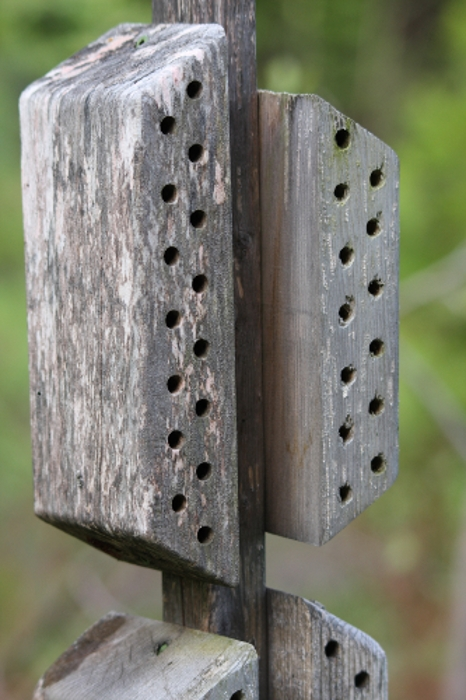
Shelter built for Megachile

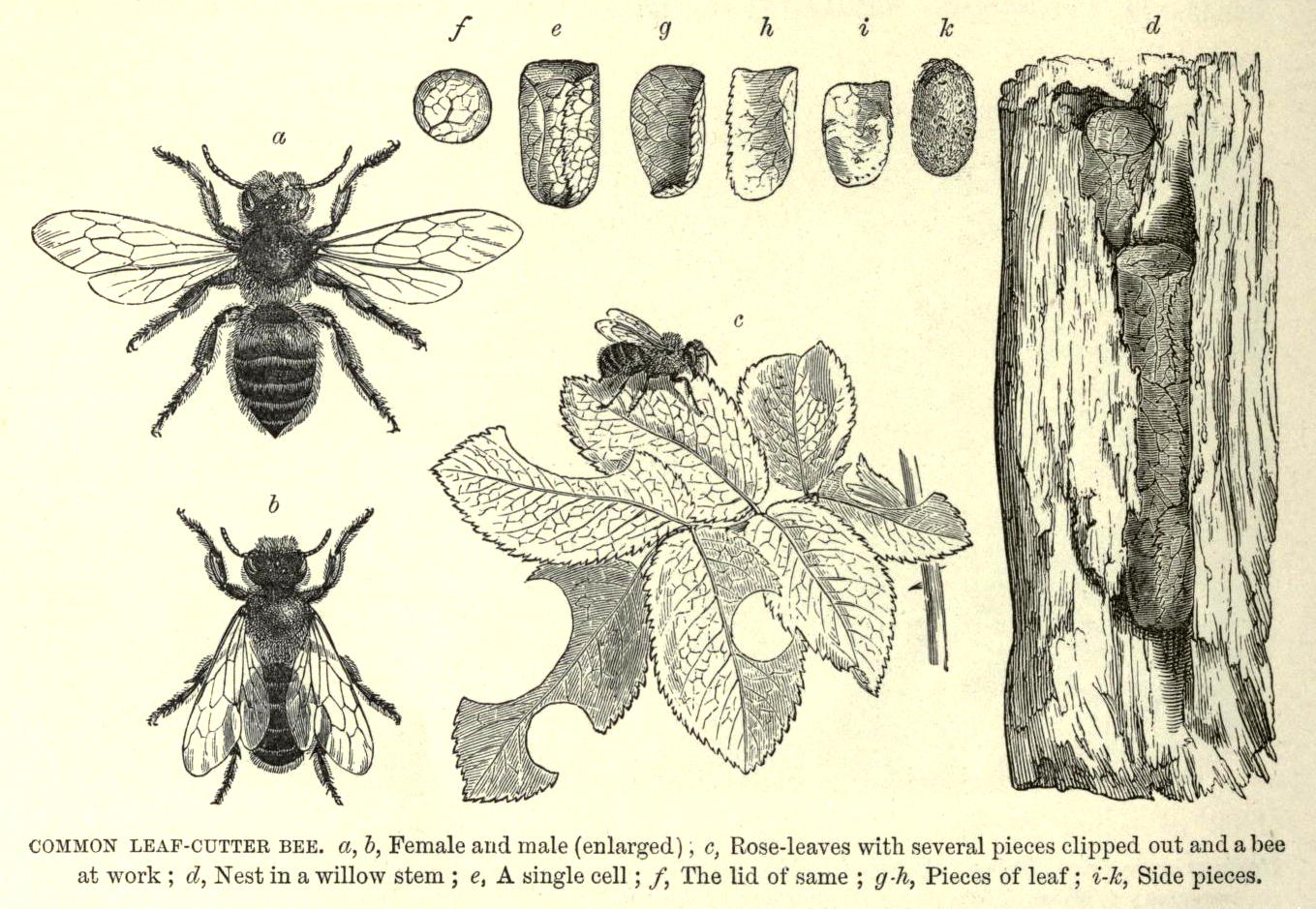
Leafcutter bee life cycle

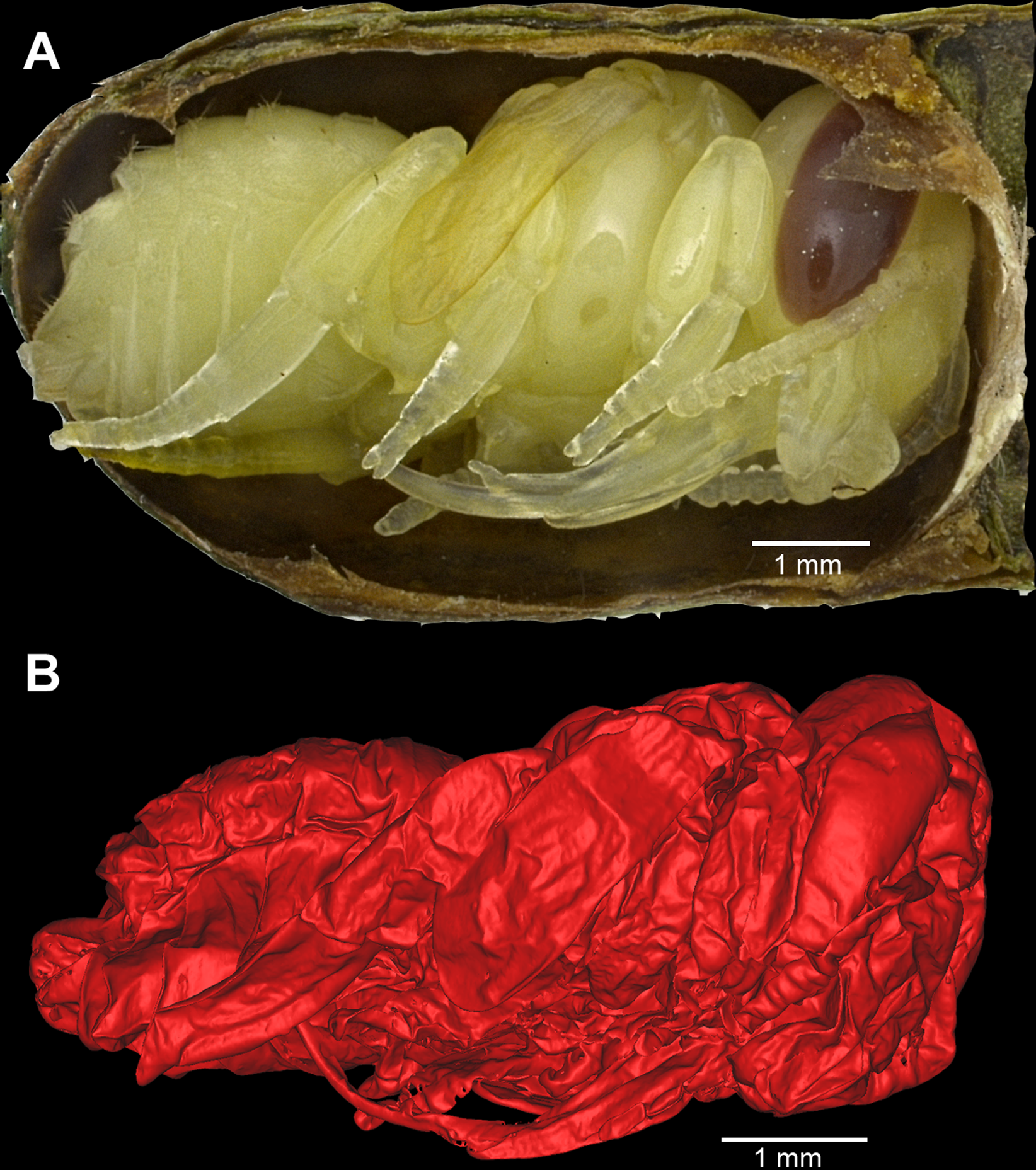
Comparison between a modern pupa and a fossil pupa from the La Brea Tar Pits

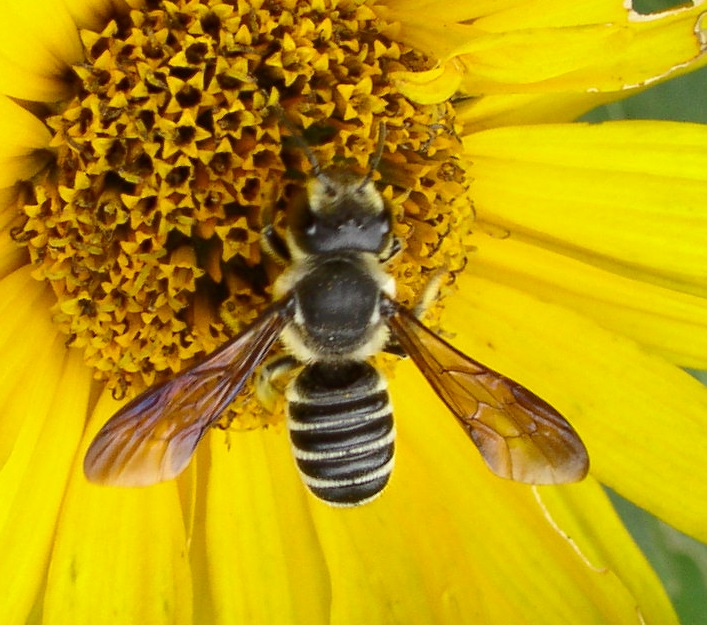
Megachile inimica female

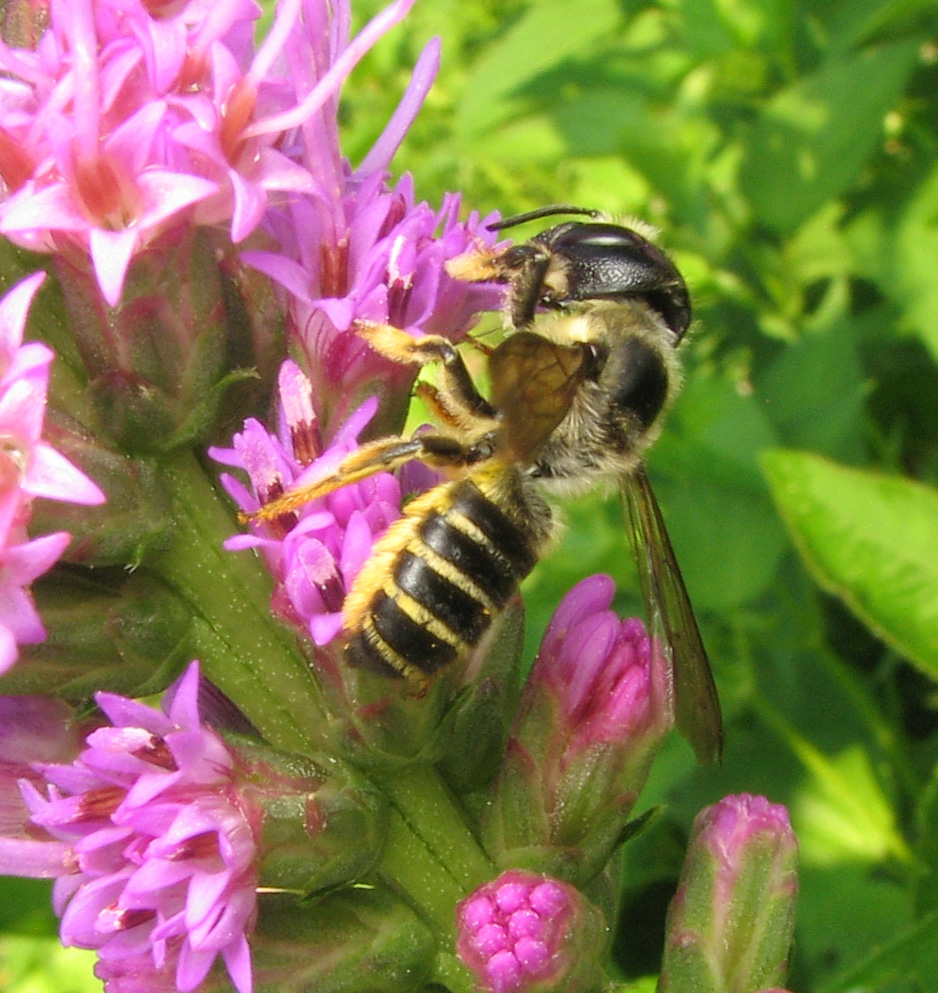
Megachile pugnata pugnata female
