= Sapyga louisi =

Scientific classification
- Kingdom: Animalia
- Phylum: Arthropoda
- Class: Insecta
- Order: Hymenoptera
- Family: Sapygidae
- Genus: Sapyga
- Species: S. louisi

Binomial name
- Sapyga louisi Krombein, 1938

Species of wasp

Sapyga louisi is a species of a club-horned wasp in the family – Sapygidae. Adults feed from flowers and the larvae are kleptoparasites of leaf cutter bee larvae, including those of Heriades carinata.

== Description and identification ==
S. louisi is distinguished from its allies by its small size and by the yellow body markings it has. The inner orbits are marked from the mandibles to nearly the upper margin of the eye. The thorax is marked with a narrow band at the anterior margin that is narrowly interrupted as well as the lateral spots behind on the pronotum, a pair of spots on the scutellum, and a band on the post-scutellum. The propodeum has a pair of spots – one on each side. The abdomen is marked with a broad band of uniform thickness on the second segment and lateral spots on the following segments - each narrowing medially. The sternites are marked with lateral spots on segments 2–4. The male differs from the female in aspects of having reduced yellow markings, lacking the spots on the lateral margins of the pronotum, the scutellum, and sternites 3 and 4.
