= Araucania (wasp) =

Scientific classification
- Kingdom: Animalia
- Phylum: Arthropoda
- Class: Insecta
- Order: Hymenoptera
- Family: Braconidae
- Subfamily: Doryctinae
- Genus: Araucania Marsh, 1993

Genus of wasps

Araucania is an invalid genus of wasp in the family Braconidae, found in South America. There are at least two described species in Araucania.

The valid genus Araucania Pate 1947, in the family Sapygidae, has nomenclatural precedence over the braconid name, published in 1993, so the latter name must be replaced, following the International Code of Zoological Nomenclature Article 52.2. (Note: ICZN Code "52.2. Operation of the Principle of Homonymy. When two or more names are homonyms, only the senior, as determined by the Principle of Priority (see Article 52.3), may be used as a valid name")

== Species ==
- Araucania maculipennis Marsh, 1993
- Araucania penai Marsh, 1993
