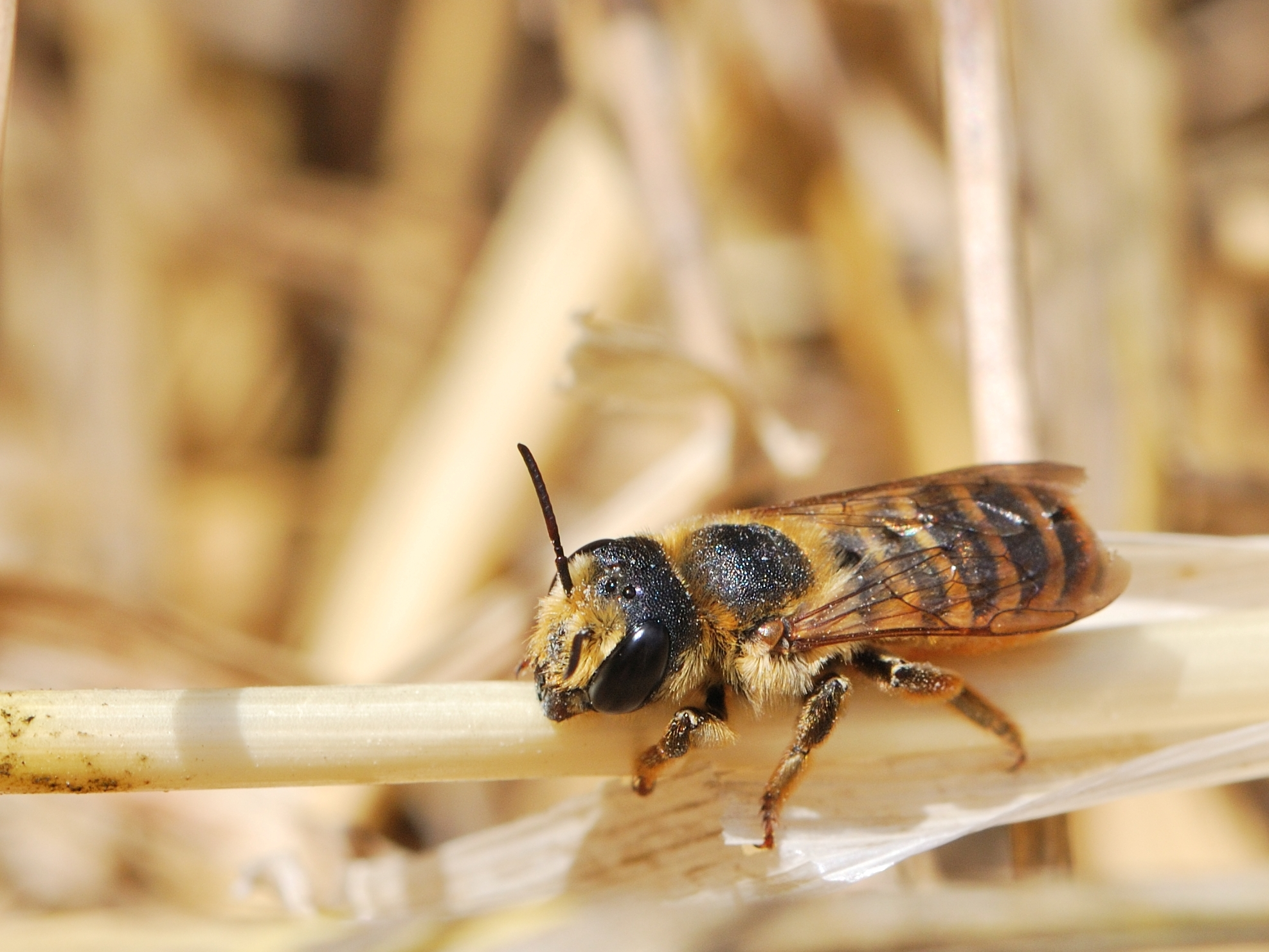
- Female

Scientific classification
- Domain: Eukaryota
- Kingdom: Animalia
- Phylum: Arthropoda
- Class: Insecta
- Order: Hymenoptera
- Family: Megachilidae
- Genus: Megachile
- Species: M. albisecta

Binomial name
- Megachile albisecta (Klug, 1817)

Synonyms
- Creightonella albisecta (Klug, 1817

= Megachile albisecta =

Species of leafcutter bee (Megachile)

Megachile albisecta is a species of leafcutter bee in the family Megachilidae. This species is present in the Southern Europe, in the East Palaearctic ecozone and in North Africa.
