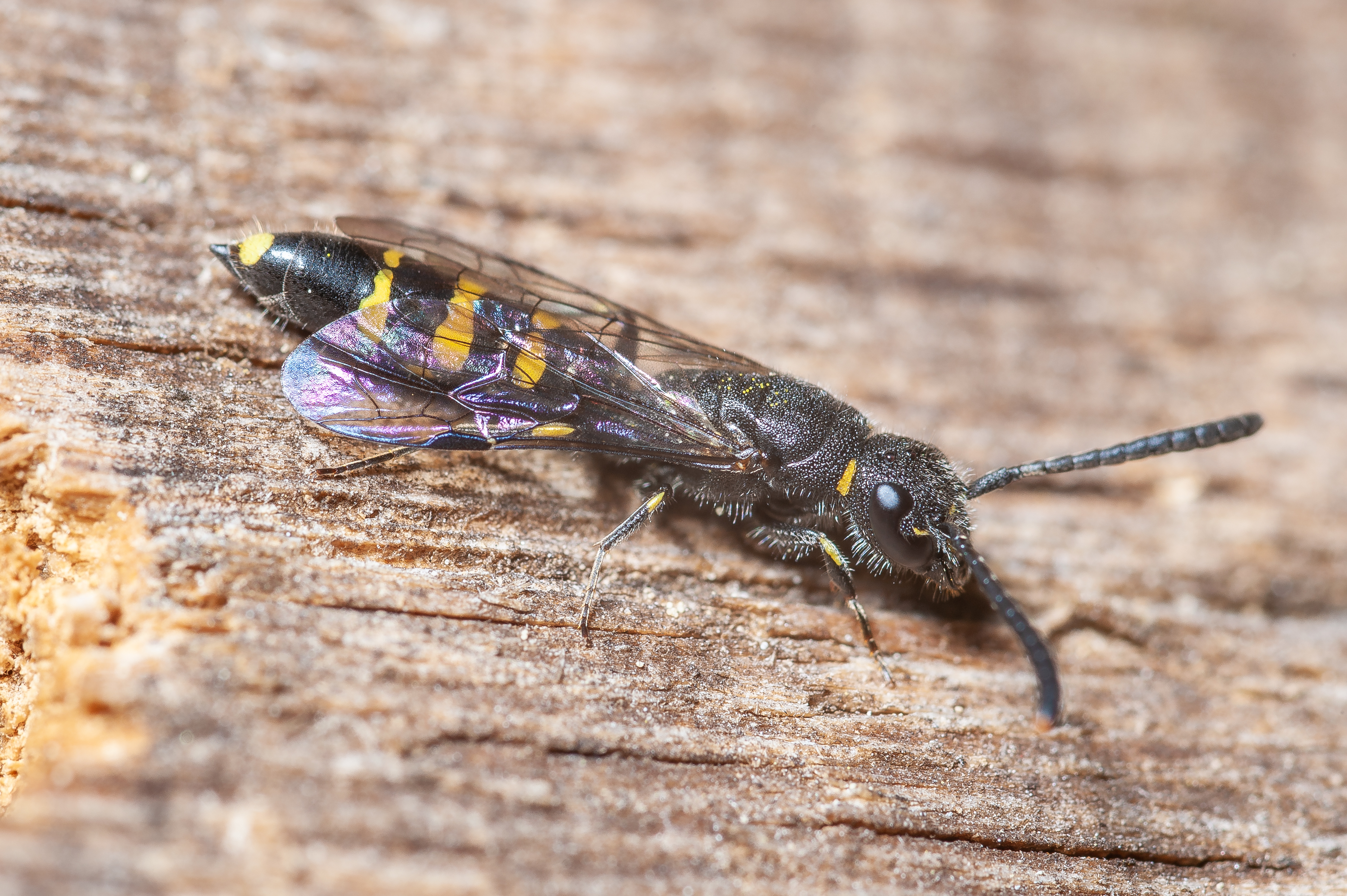

Scientific classification
- Kingdom: Animalia
- Phylum: Arthropoda
- Clade: Pancrustacea
- Class: Insecta
- Order: Hymenoptera
- Family: Sapygidae
- Genus: Monosapyga
- Species: M. clavicornis

Binomial name
- Monosapyga clavicornis Carl Linnaeus, 1758

= Monosapyga clavicornis =

Species of insect

Monosapyga clavicornis is a hymenopteran from the family Sapygidae. The species is common and not endangered.

== Description ==
The animals reach a body length of 8–12 millimetres. Their body is black and has small yellow spots on the head, thorax and legs. On each of the second to fourth abdominal segments there is a pair of yellow patches, which usually merge to form bandages. On the last tergite there is another yellow spot in the middle, in the males it is whitish coloured. The tips of the antennae are yellow-brown.

== Occurrence ==
The species is widespread in Central Europe and is common in places. It lives near the nesting places of its hosts, especially on old wooden posts. The flight period is from March/April to July.

== Biology ==
The wasp parasitizes bees of the genera Heriades, Osmia and Anthophora. The females are often found near the nest openings of bees in dead wood or hollow stalks. An egg is laid anywhere in an unsealed brood cell of bees, filled with pollen and nectar. The wasp larva hatching from it first sucks out the bee egg and then feeds on the supplies. In some years the wasp populations are so large that they can significantly decimate the bees.

== Sources ==
- Heiko Bellmann: Bienen, Wespen, Ameisen. Hautflügler Mitteleuropas. Franckh-Kosmos Verlags-GmbH & Co KG, Stuttgart 1995, ISBN 3-440-09690-4.
