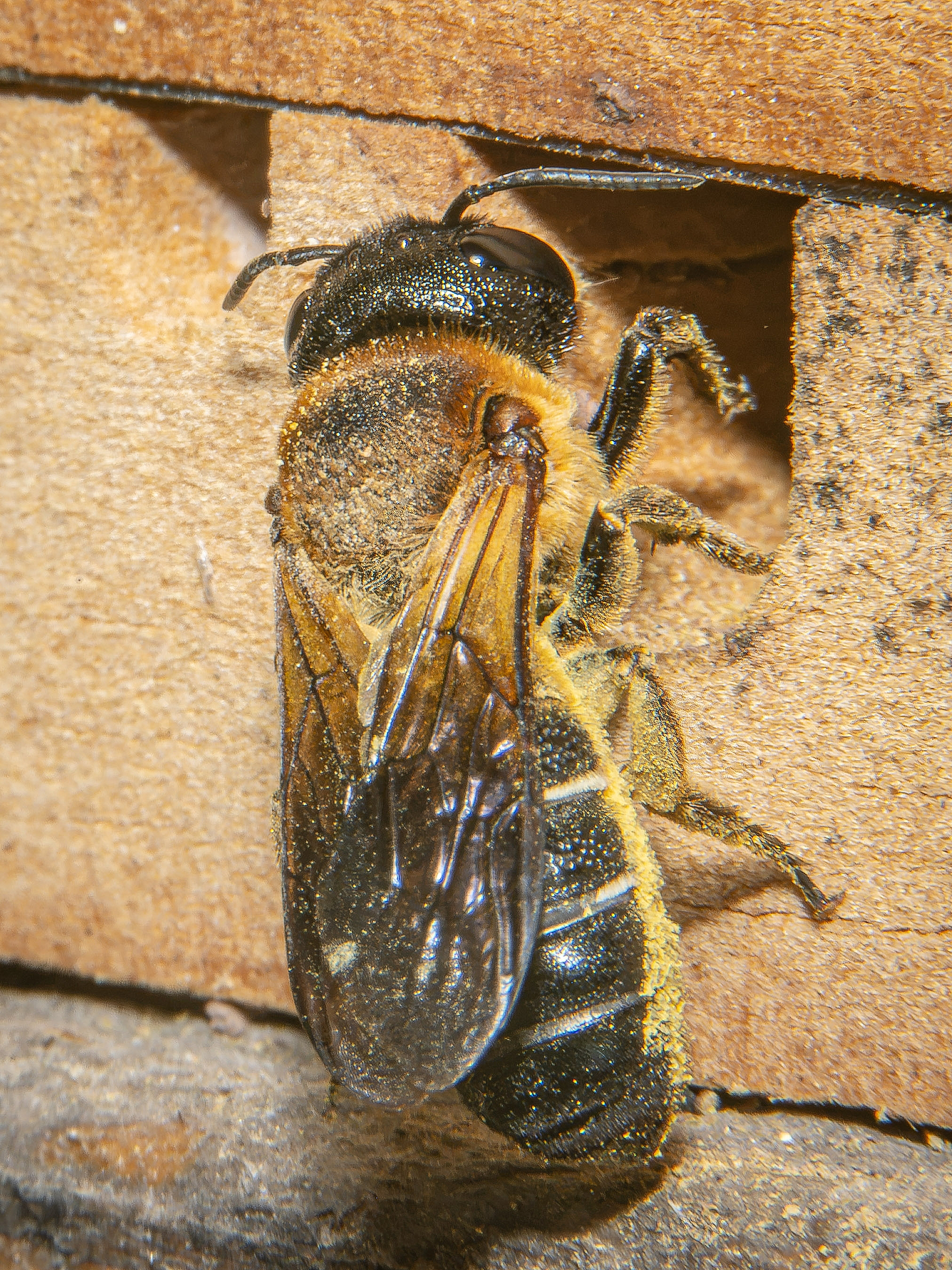
- Megachile sculpturalis

Scientific classification
- Kingdom: Animalia
- Phylum: Arthropoda
- Clade: Pancrustacea
- Class: Insecta
- Order: Hymenoptera
- Family: Megachilidae
- Genus: Megachile
- Species: M. sculpturalis

Binomial name
- Megachile sculpturalis Smith, 1853

Synonyms
- Megachile koreensis Radoszkowski, 1890; Megachile doederleinii Friese, 1898; Megachile (Eumegachile) sculpturalis var nudicollis Alfken, 1936; Chalicodoma (Eumegachilana) sculpturalis (Smith, 1853); Chalicodoma (Callomegachile) sculpturalis (Smith, 1853); Megachile (Callomegachile) sculpturalis nudicollis Alfken, 1936

= Megachile sculpturalis =

Species of leafcutter bee (Megachile)

Megachile sculpturalis, known as the giant resin bee and sculptured resin bee, is a species of leafcutting bees belonging to the family Megachilidae.

== Distribution ==
Native to Japan and China, it has been introduced to the Eastern United States and Ontario, Canada in recent times. First established in the United States during the early 1990s, records currently exist from most states east of the Mississippi River. In Europe, it was first observed close to Marseille's (France) port in 2008. Since then, this invasive species has also been recorded in the following European countries: Bosnia & Herzegovina, Germany, Hungary, Italy, Serbia, Slovenia, Spain, and Switzerland.

== Description ==
Megachile sculpturalis can reach a body length of about 19–22 mm (0.75–0.87 in) in males, while females usually are larger than males, reaching about 21–25 mm (0.83–0.98 in). It is much bigger than most other leafcutting bees. The body is cylindrical, jaws are large and wings are transparent, with a brown color that darkens toward the tips. Head and abdomen are mainly black, the abdomen is rather shiny and without hairs, while thorax is covered with dense yellowish-brown pubescence. In males the abdomen is truncated and squared, while in the females it is almost tapered, and pointed. The female has four dentate mandibles.

== Habitat ==
In the United States, these resin bees occur in nests of Xylocopa spp., often around wooden structures such as doors, decks and porches.

== Biology ==
Adults can be found from June to-September. These solitary bees are known to make during the summer their nests in available holes found in wooden structures or in small crevices between wood boards and often they use cavities belonging to carpenter bees. They do not bore holes into wood. Their individual cells are constructed using wood particles and mud. They provide each cell with pollen carried on the underside of their hairy abdomen. Then they lay in each cell a single egg. Females also use their large jaws to collect resin (hence the common name), used to cap the brood cells. The larvae overwinter inside the cells, consuming the pollen. In spring they pupate and emerge as an adult in early summer.

The main recorded host plants are Lathyrus latifolius and Sophora japonica (Fabaceae), Pycnanthemum species (Lamiaceae), Lythrum salicaria (Lythraceae), Koelreuteria paniculata (Sapindaceae) and Buddleia species (Scrophulariaceae).

== Gallery ==
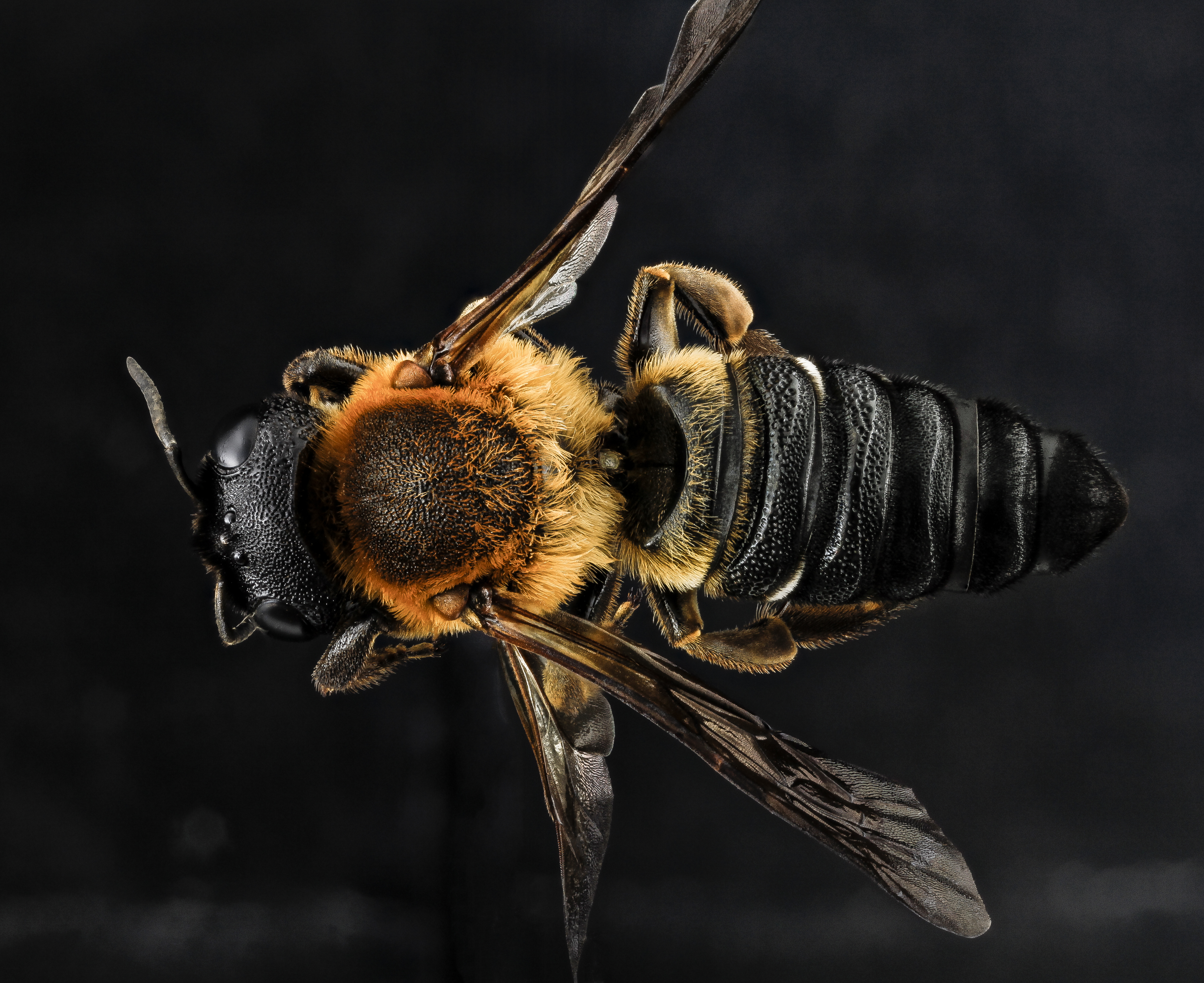
Mounted specimen. Female, dorsal view

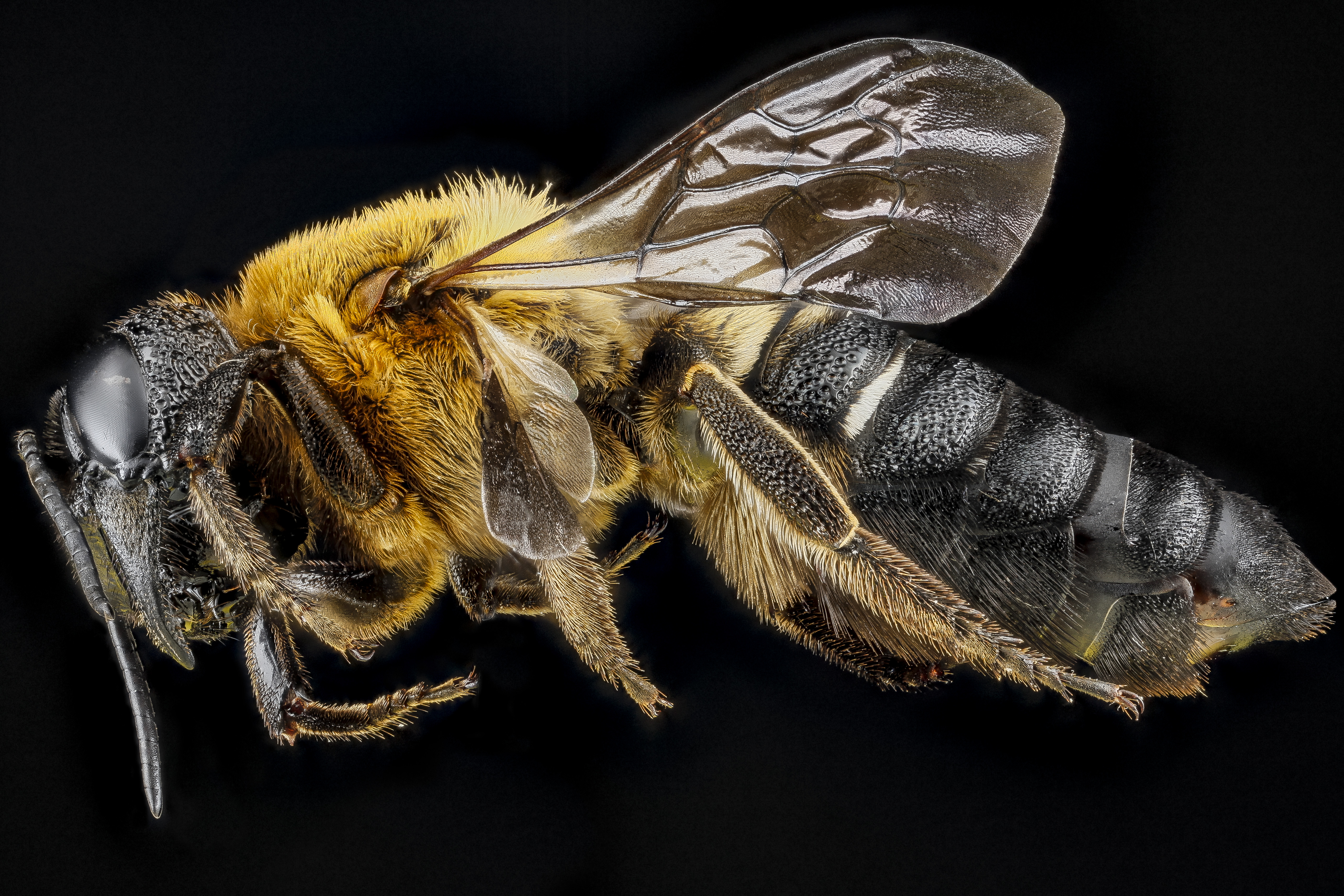
Side view

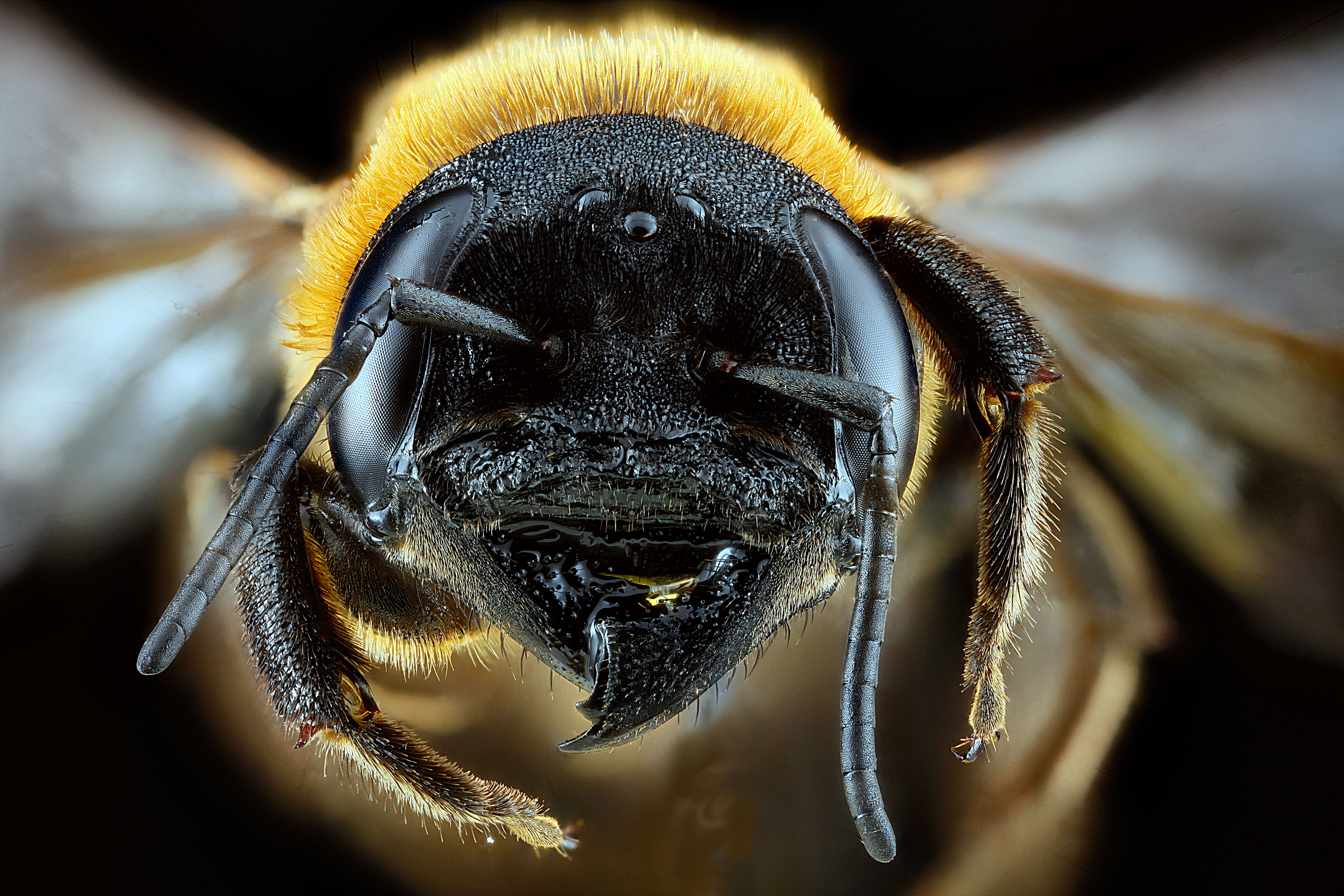
Close-up on the head

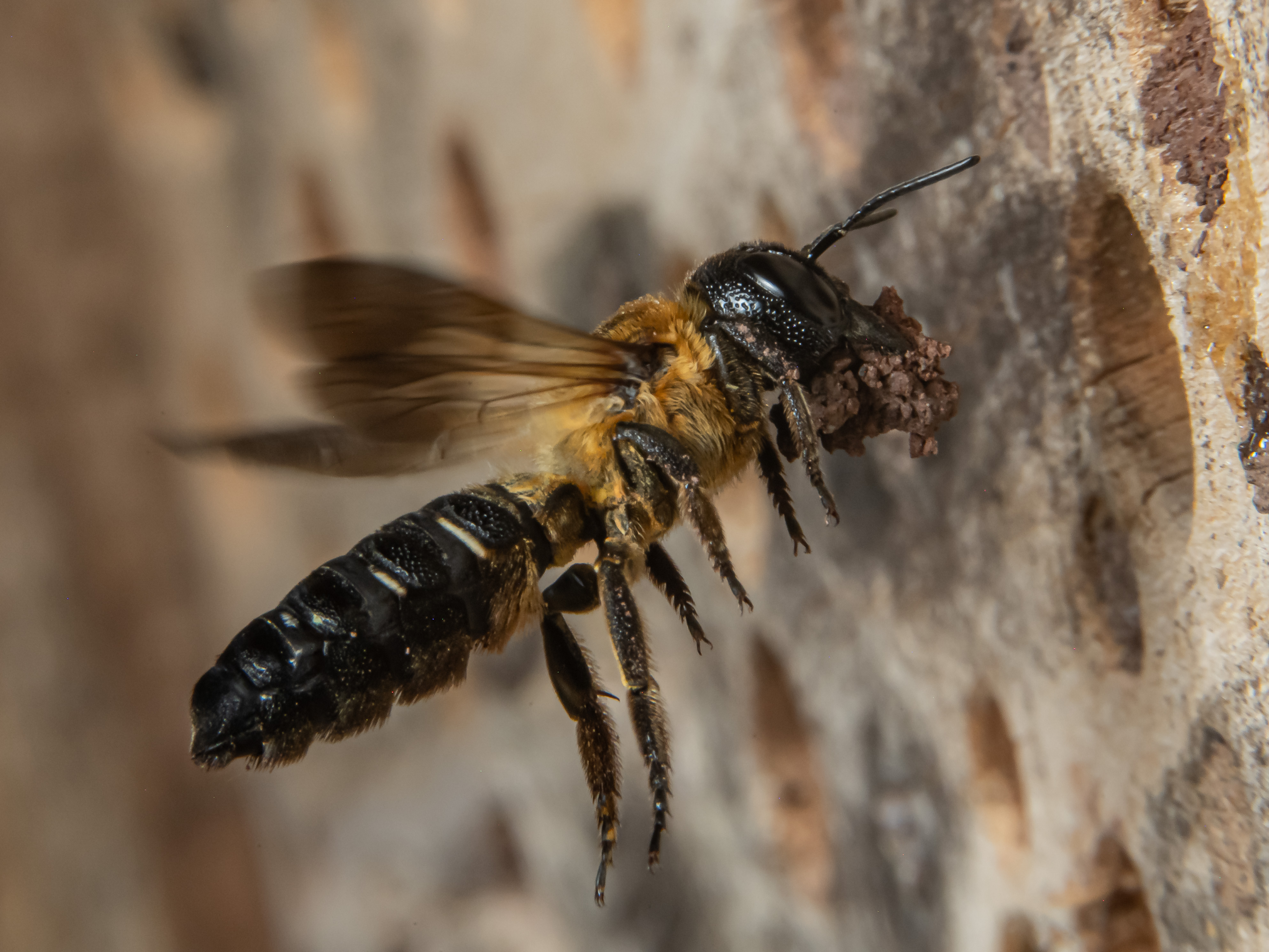
Approaching a nesting tube with a ball of clay

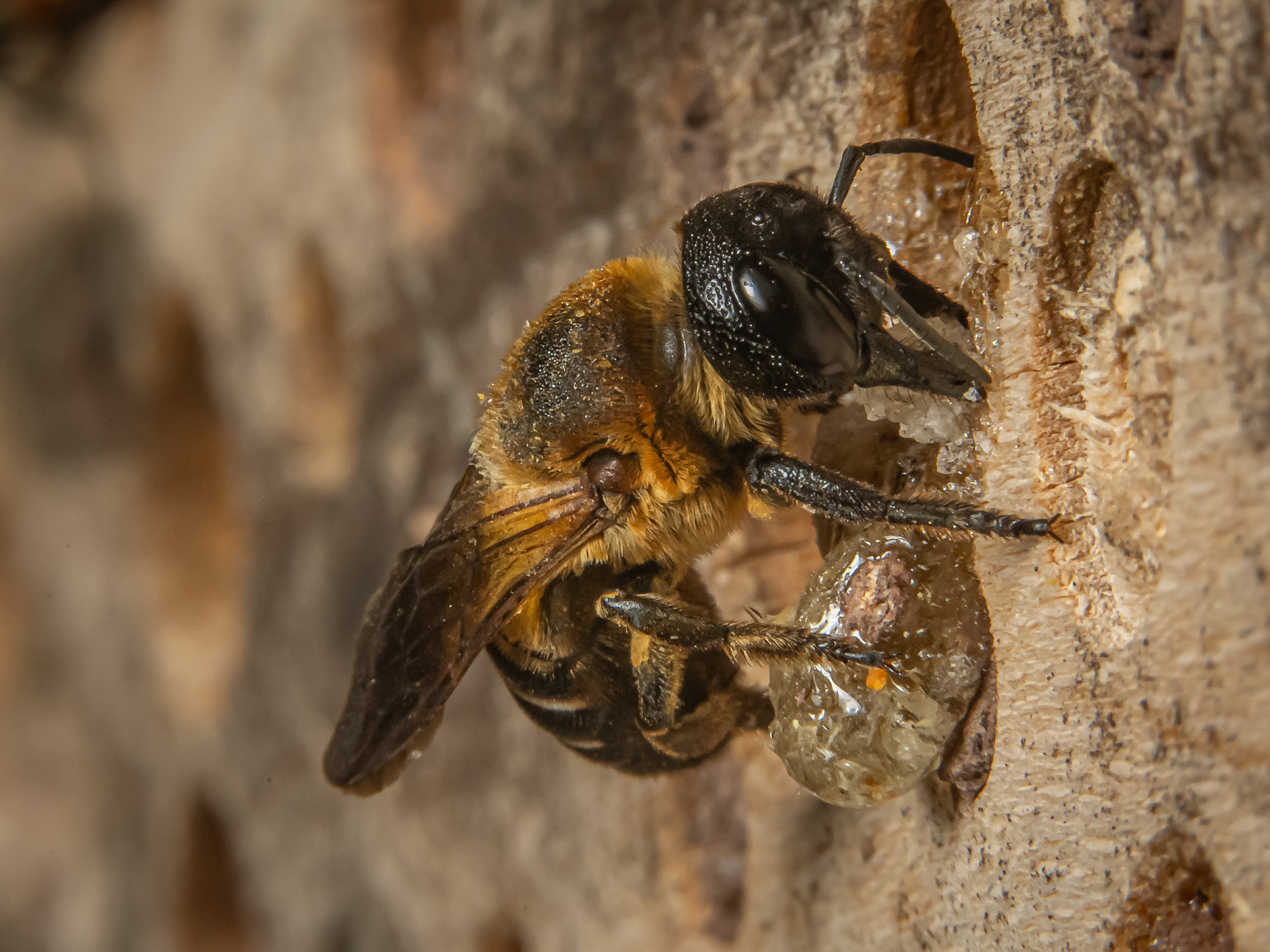
Closing the nesting tube

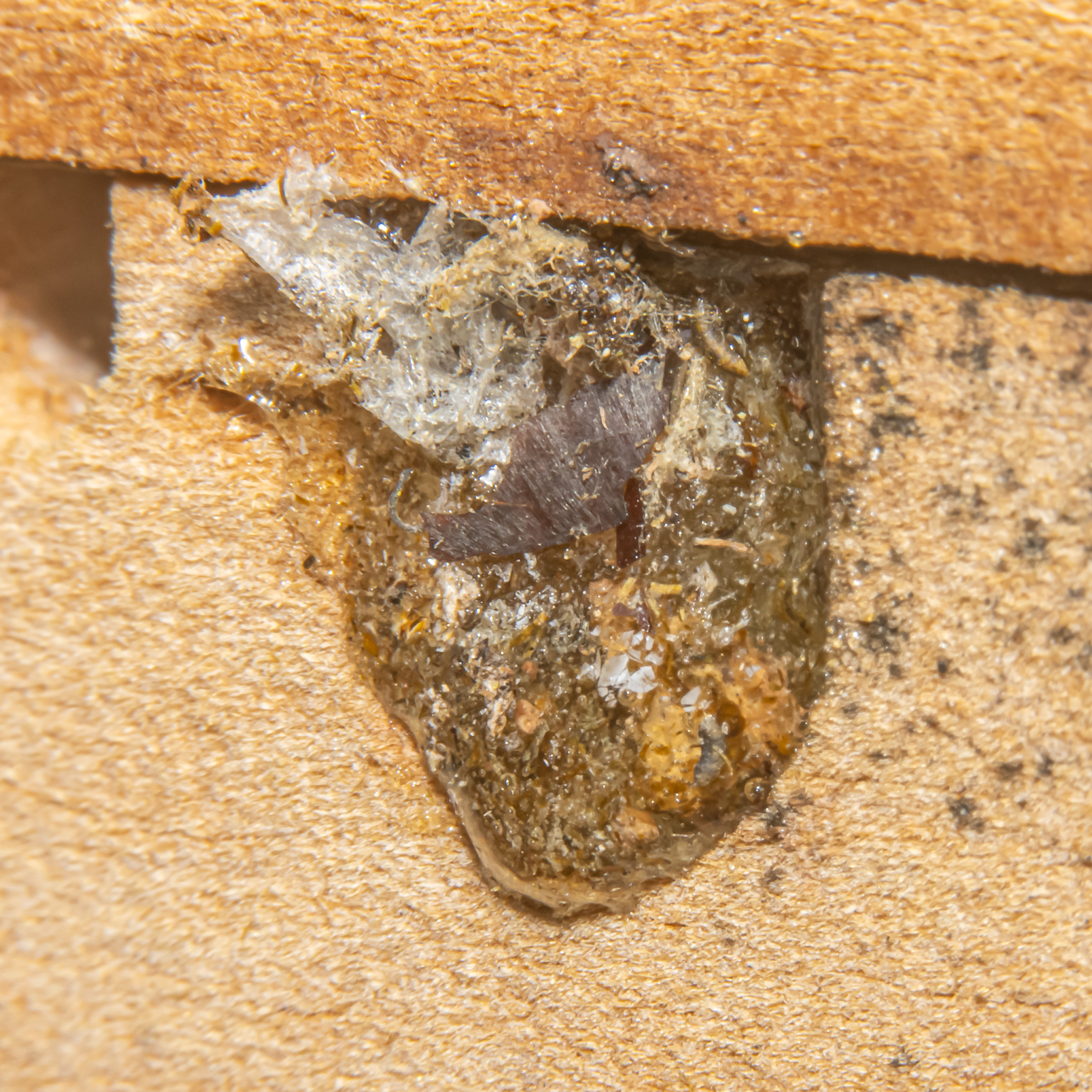
Closed nesting tube
