= Monosapyga =

Scientific classification
- Kingdom: Animalia
- Phylum: Arthropoda
- Clade: Pancrustacea
- Class: Insecta
- Order: Hymenoptera
- Family: Sapygidae
- Genus: Monosapyga; Pic, 1920

Genus of insects

Monosapyga is a genus of insects belonging to the family Sapygidae.

The species of this genus are found in Europe.

Species:

- Monosapyga clavicornis (Linnaeus, 1758)
