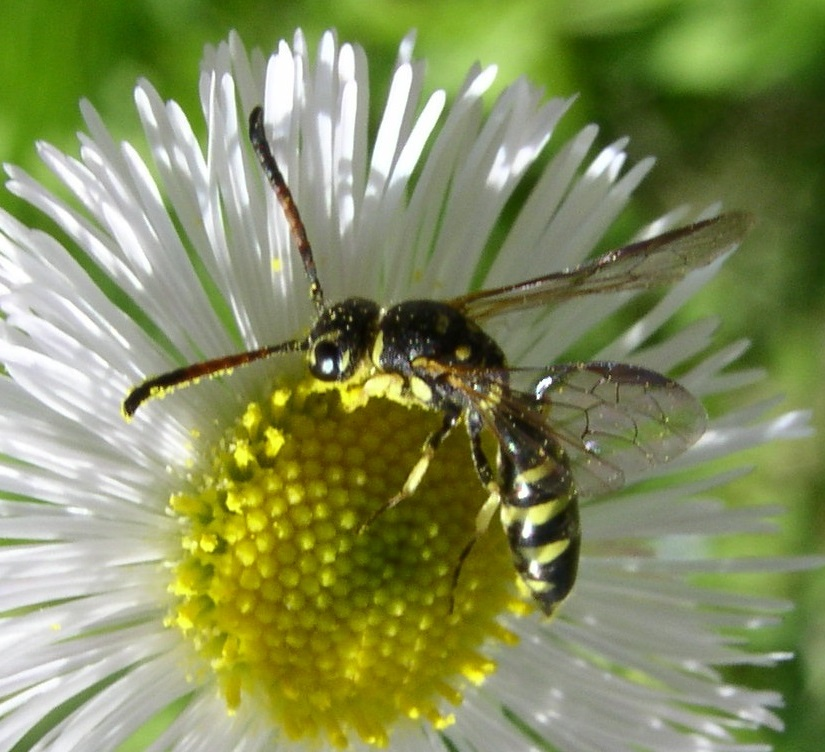
- Sapyga centrata

Scientific classification
- Kingdom: Animalia
- Phylum: Arthropoda
- Class: Insecta
- Order: Hymenoptera
- Family: Sapygidae
- Genus: Sapyga; Latreille, 1796

= Sapyga =

Genus of wasps

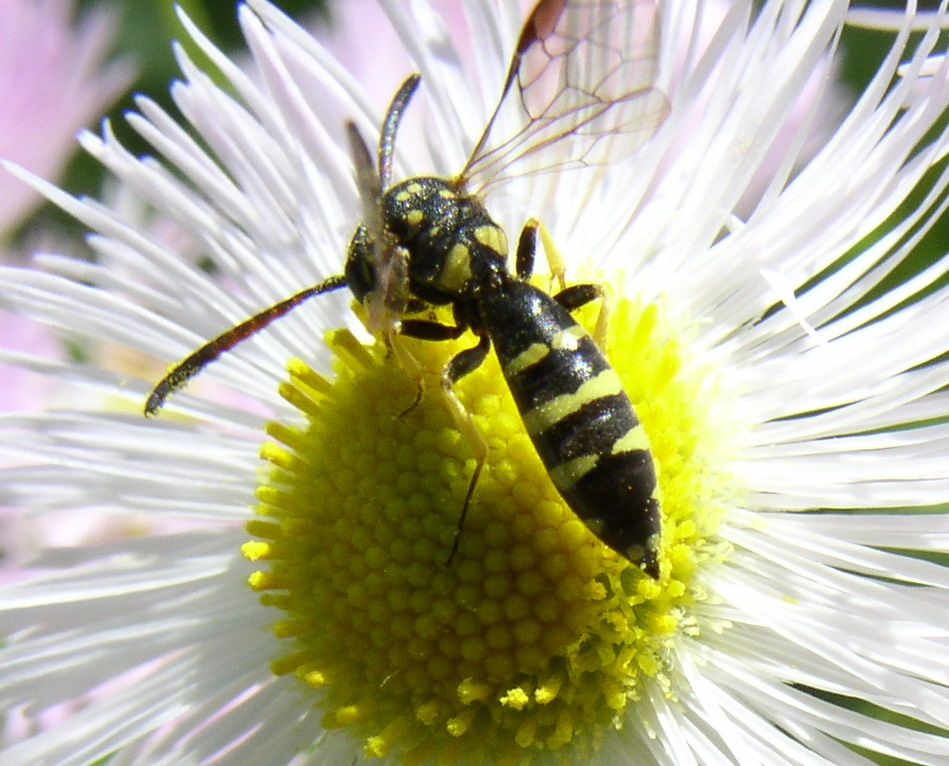
Sapyga centrata

Sapyga is a genus of sapygid wasps. At least 19 species have been described in the genus.

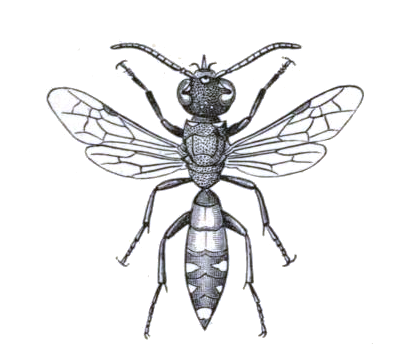
Female Sapyga

== Species ==
- Sapyga angustata Cresson, 1880
- Sapyga caucasica Radoszkowsky, 1880
- Sapyga centrata Say, 1836
- Sapyga coma Yasumatsu
- Sapyga glasunovi Morawitz, 1893
- Sapyga gusenleitneri Kurzenko, 1994
- Sapyga gussakovskii Kurzenko, 1986
- Sapyga hissarica Kurzenko, 1986
- Sapyga louisi Krombein, 1938
- Sapyga martini Smith, 1855
- Sapyga morawitzi Turner, 1911
- Sapyga multinotata Pic, 1920
- Sapyga mutica Kurzenko, 1994
- Sapyga octoguttata Dufour, 1849
- Sapyga pulcherrima Morawitz, 1894
- Sapyga quinquepunctata (Fabricius, 1781)
- Sapyga raddi Kurzenko, 1986
- Sapyga similis (Fabricius, 1793)
- Sapyga singla Kurzenko, 1994
