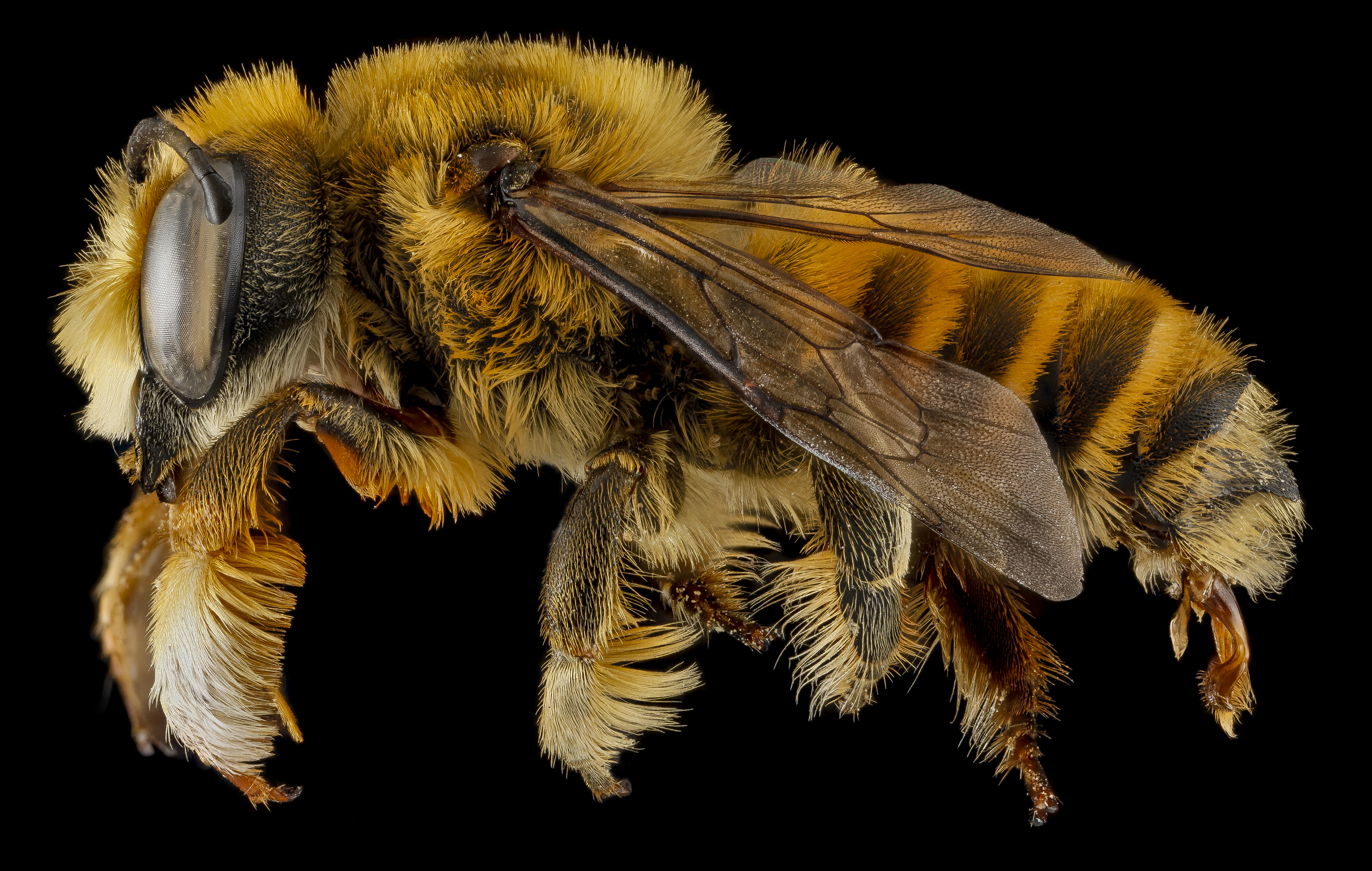

Conservation status
- Imperiled (NatureServe)

Scientific classification
- Domain: Eukaryota
- Kingdom: Animalia
- Phylum: Arthropoda
- Class: Insecta
- Order: Hymenoptera
- Family: Megachilidae
- Genus: Megachile
- Species: M. fortis

Binomial name
- Megachile fortis Cresson, 1872

= Megachile fortis =

Species of leafcutter bee (Megachile)

Megachile fortis is a species of bee in the family Megachilidae. It was described by Cresson in 1872.
