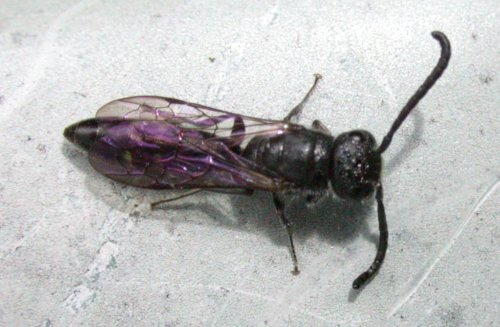
- Female

Scientific classification
- Kingdom: Animalia
- Phylum: Arthropoda
- Class: Insecta
- Order: Hymenoptera
- Family: Sapygidae
- Genus: Sapyga
- Species: S. quinquepunctata

Binomial name
- Sapyga quinquepunctata (Fabricius, 1781)

Synonyms
- Scolia quinquepunctata Fabricius, 1781

= Sapyga quinquepunctata =

Wasp species

Sapyga quinquepunctata is a species of sapygid wasp. It is a parasite of mason bees.
