= Arauco (moth) =

Scientific classification
- Kingdom: Animalia
- Phylum: Arthropoda
- Class: Insecta
- Order: Lepidoptera
- Family: Geometridae
- Tribe: Nacophorini
- Genus: Arauco

Genus of geometer moths

Arauco is a genus of moths in the family Geometridae.

== Species ==
Arauco schajovskoyi Rindge, 1983
