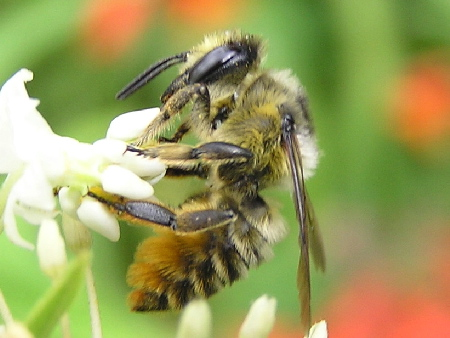

Scientific classification
- Kingdom: Animalia
- Phylum: Arthropoda
- Class: Insecta
- Order: Hymenoptera
- Family: Megachilidae
- Genus: Megachile
- Species: M. perihirta

Binomial name
- Megachile perihirta Cockerell, 1898

= Megachile perihirta =

Species of leafcutter bee (Megachile)

Megachile perihirta, commonly known as the Western leafcutting bee, is a bee in the genus Megachile. The bee is native to western North America, ranging from Nebraska to Texas and Mexico, west to California, and north to British Columbia and Alberta, and often inhabits meadows and orchards. The bee is black with long whitish-yellow hair, more so below the thorax and abdomen. The abdomen, however, is mostly bare, although each segment has scattered whitish hair. The wings of the Western leafcutting bee are clear, while their veins are black. The pollen basket below the abdomen is bright red.

Like most bees, adult western leafcutting bees drink nectar, whilst Western leafcutting bee larva feed both on nectar and pollen. Western Leafcutting Bee nests are created when a small group of bees work together to dig small burrows in sand, gravel, soil, or in rotting plants or wood. Inside this burrow it is found that the bees construct a series of cells lined with leaf fragments. Each cell contains pollen and nectar, then one egg is laid inside a cell. Adult Western leafcutting bees are seen normally from July to August, and live around one year.
