= Araucanian islands =

Araucanian islands may refer to the following islands in Chile:

- Mocha Island
- Quiriquina Island
- Santa María Island, Chile
