= Araucania chilensis =

Scientific classification
- Kingdom: Animalia
- Phylum: Arthropoda
- Class: Insecta
- Order: Hymenoptera
- Family: Sapygidae
- Genus: Araucania; Pate, 1947
- Species: A. chilensis

Binomial name
- Araucania chilensis (Reed, 1930)

Synonyms
- Laura Reed, 1930 (Preocc.)

Monotypic genus of wasps

Araucania is a monotypic genus of wasps belonging to the family Sapygidae. The only species is Araucania chilensis, occurring in Chile.
