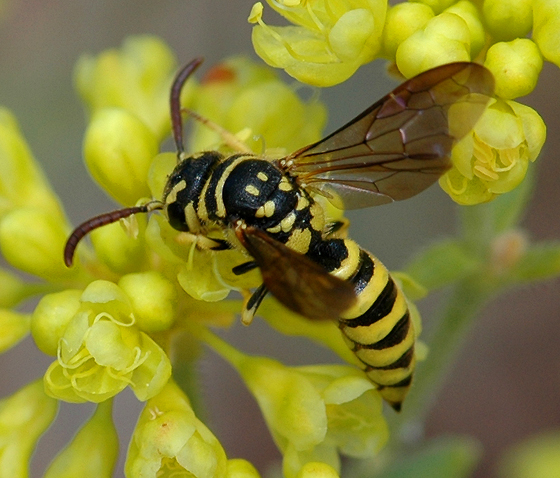
- Female Eusapyga verticalis on Eriogonum

Scientific classification
- Domain: Eukaryota
- Kingdom: Animalia
- Phylum: Arthropoda
- Class: Insecta
- Order: Hymenoptera
- Superfamily: Pompiloidea
- Family: Sapygidae

Genera
- Araucania; Asmisapyga; Eusapyga; Fedtschenkia; Huarpea; Krombeinopyga; Monosapyga; Parasapyga; Polochridium; Polochrum; Sapyga; Sapygina

= Sapygidae =

Family of wasps

The Sapygidae are a family of solitary kleptoparasitic aculeate wasps. They are generally black wasps, similar in appearance to some Tiphiidae or Thynnidae, with white or yellow markings developed to various degrees.

The female oviposits her eggs into the nests of solitary bees, and the developing larvae consume both the host larvae and the supply of food provided for them.

The Sapygidae are a small family with only about 80 species described, and they are not of major economic importance. However, some of their host species are important pollinators, and it may sometimes be necessary to control the level of predation on them.

Fossil sapygids have been found in mid-Cretaceous amber in Myanmar and Upper Eocene Baltic amber.

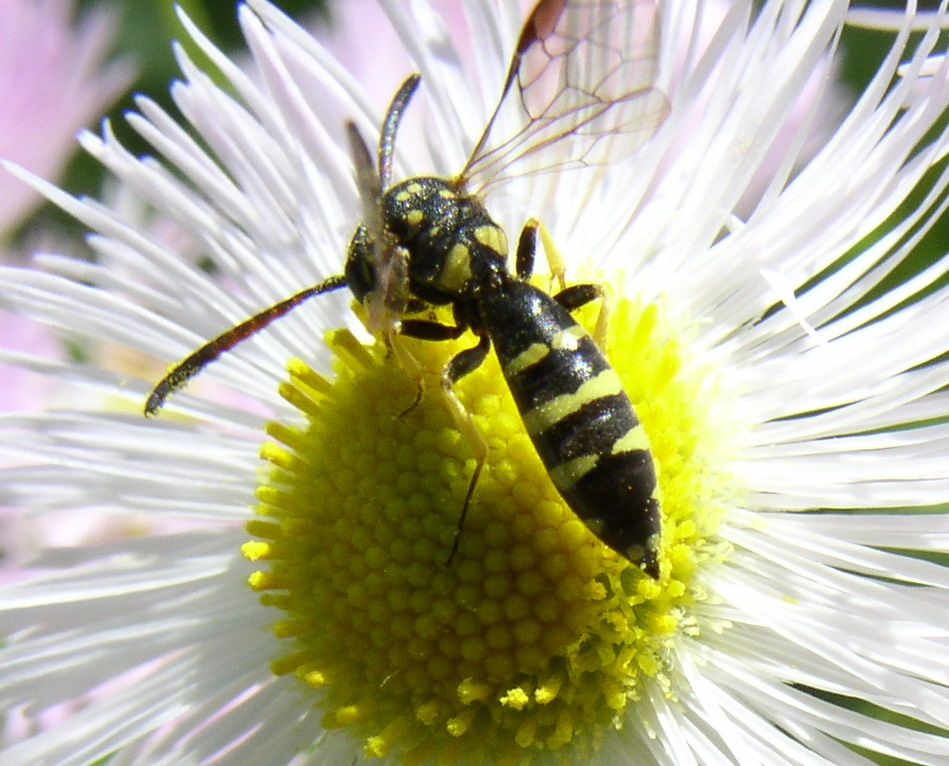
Sapyga centrata

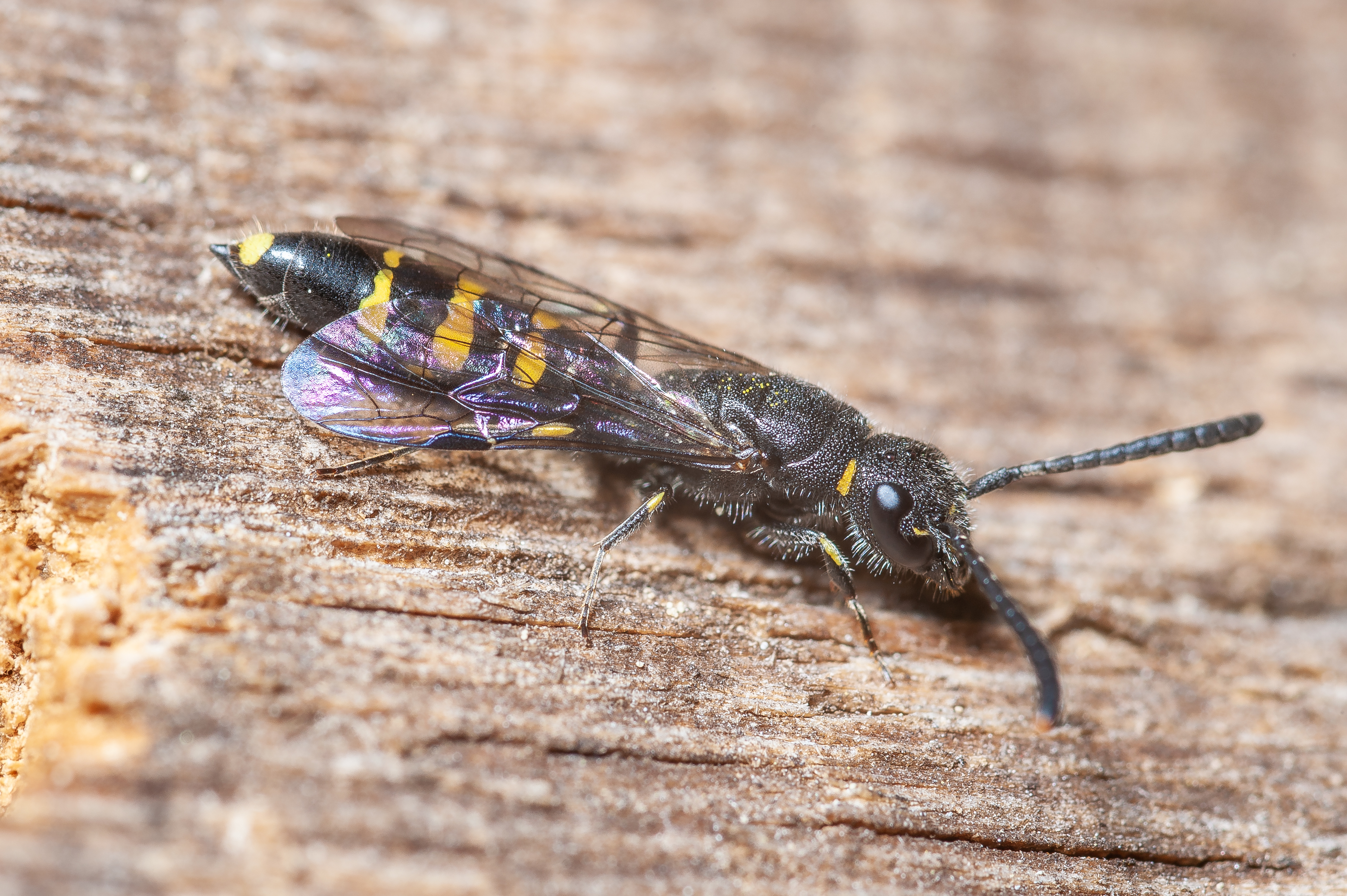
Monosapyga clavicornis
