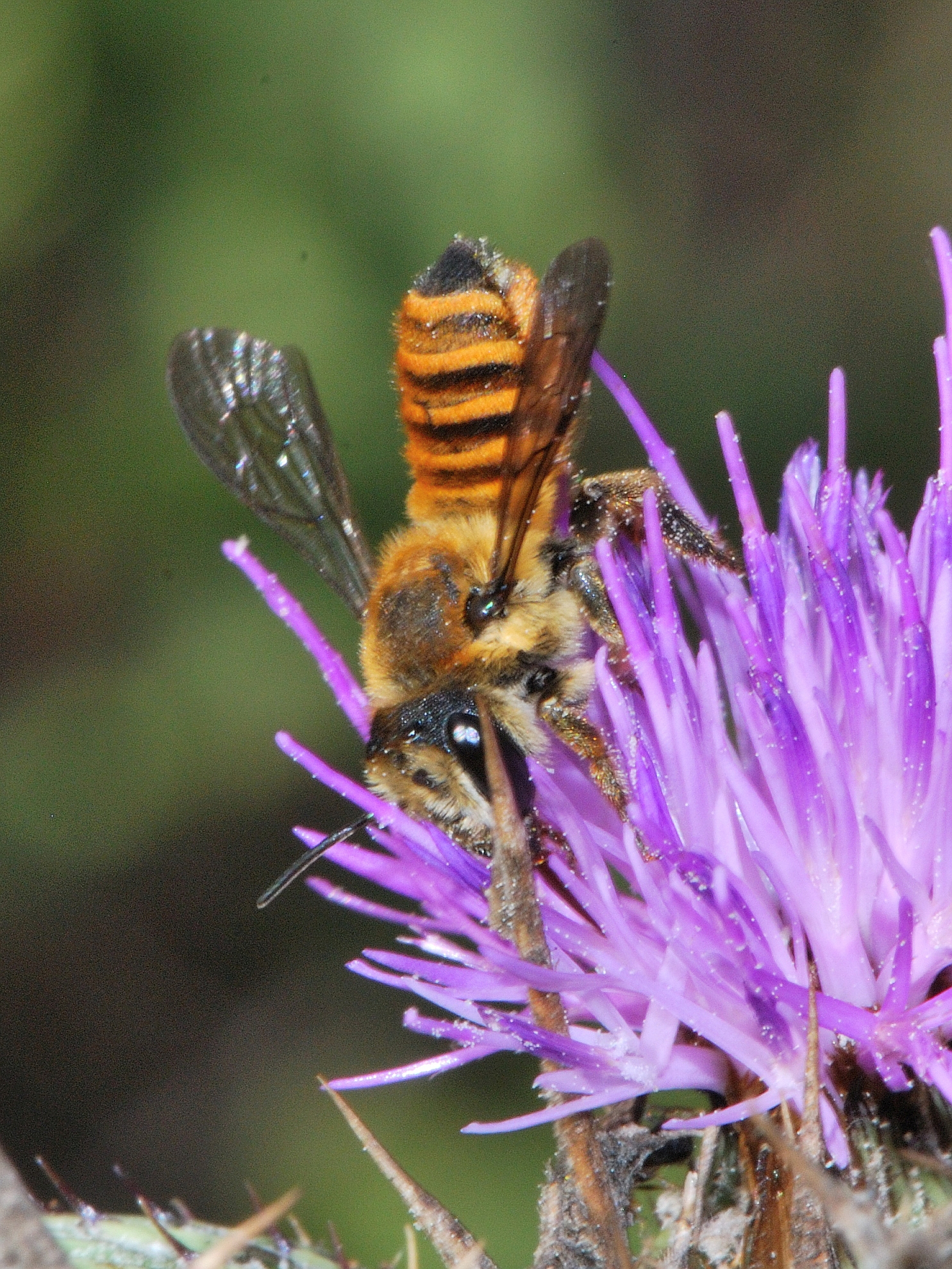

Scientific classification
- Domain: Eukaryota
- Kingdom: Animalia
- Phylum: Arthropoda
- Class: Insecta
- Order: Hymenoptera
- Family: Megachilidae
- Genus: Megachile
- Species: M. melanopyga

Binomial name
- Megachile melanopyga Costa, 1863

Synonyms
- Megachile hymenaea Gerstaecker, 1869; Megachile melanopyga vulpecolor Hedicke, 1938; Megachile melanopyga zakakica Mavromoustakis, 1957; Megachile melanopyga rhodia Tkalcu, 2005

= Megachile melanopyga =

Species of leafcutter bee (Megachile)

Megachile melanopyga is a species of bee in the family Megachilidae. It is found in Europe.
