= Megachile pilicrus =

Scientific classification
- Kingdom: Animalia
- Phylum: Arthropoda
- Clade: Pancrustacea
- Class: Insecta
- Order: Hymenoptera
- Family: Megachilidae
- Genus: Megachile
- Species: M. pilicrus

Binomial name
- Megachile pilicrus Morawitz, 1877

Species of leafcutter bee (Megachile)

Megachile pilicrus is a species of bee in the family of Megachilidae. It was first described by Morawitz in 1877.
