= Megachile esseniensis =

Scientific classification
- Domain: Eukaryota
- Kingdom: Animalia
- Phylum: Arthropoda
- Class: Insecta
- Order: Hymenoptera
- Family: Megachilidae
- Genus: Megachile
- Species: M. esseniensis

Binomial name
- Megachile esseniensis (Pasteels, 1979)

Species of leafcutter bee (Megachile)

Megachile esseniensis is a species of bee in the family Megachilidae. It was described by Pasteels in 1979.
