= Megachile inexspectata =

Scientific classification
- Domain: Eukaryota
- Kingdom: Animalia
- Phylum: Arthropoda
- Class: Insecta
- Order: Hymenoptera
- Family: Megachilidae
- Genus: Megachile
- Species: M. inexspectata

Binomial name
- Megachile inexspectata Rebmann, 1968

Species of leafcutter bee (Megachile)

Megachile inexspectata is a species of bee in the family Megachilidae. It was described by Rebmann in 1968.
