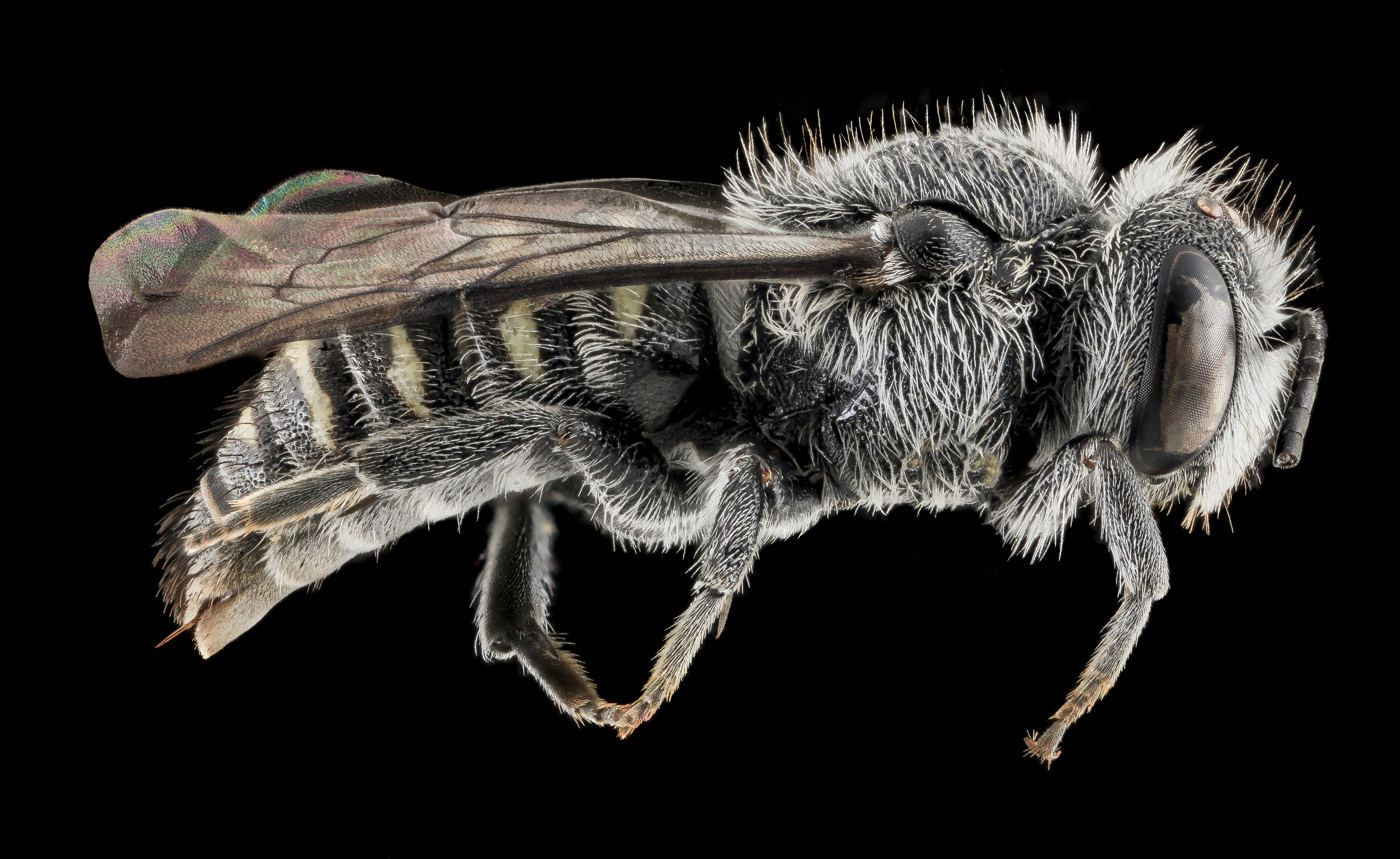
- Stelis labiata

Scientific classification
- Kingdom: Animalia
- Phylum: Arthropoda
- Clade: Pancrustacea
- Class: Insecta
- Order: Hymenoptera
- Family: Megachilidae
- Subfamily: Megachilinae

Tribes
- See text

= Megachilinae =

Megachilinae Temporal range: Paleocene–Recent

Subfamily of bees

Megachilinae is the largest subfamily of bees in the family Megachilidae. It includes mason bees, leafcutter bees, and carder bees.

- Tribe Anthidiini
  - Acedanthidium
  - Afranthidium
  - Afrostelis
  - Anthidiellum
  - Anthidioma
  - Anthidium
  - Anthodioctes
  - Apianthidium
  - Aspidosmia
  - Austrostelis
  - Aztecanthidium
  - Bathanthidium
  - Benanthis
  - Cyphanthidium
  - Dianthidium
  - Duckeanthidium
  - Eoanthidium
  - Epanthidium
  - Euaspis
  - Hoplostelis
  - Hypanthidioides
  - Hypanthidium
  - Icteranthidium
  - Indanthidium
  - Larinostelis
  - Notanthidium
  - Pachyanthidium
  - Paranthidium
  - Plesianthidium
  - Pseudoanthidium
  - Rhodanthidium
  - Serapista
  - Stelis Panzer
  - Tithonanthidium?
  - Trachusa
  - Trachusoides
  - Xenostelis
- †Tribe Ctenoplectrellini
  - †Ctenoplectrella
  - †Probombus
- Tribe Dioxyini
  - Aglaoapis
  - Allodioxys
  - Dioxys
  - Ensliniana
  - Eudioxys
  - Metadioxys
  - Paradioxys
  - Prodioxys
- Tribe Lithurgini
  - Lithurgus
  - Microthurge
  - Trichothurgus
- Tribe Megachilini
  - Coelioxys
  - Megachile
  - Radoszkowskiana
- Tribe Osmiini
  - Afroheriades
  - Ashmeadiella
  - Atoposmia
  - Bekilia
  - Chelostoma
  - Haetosmia
  - Heriades
  - Hofferia
  - Hoplitis
  - Hoplosmia
  - Noteriades
  - Osmia
  - Othinosmia
  - Protosmia
  - Pseudoheriades
  - Stenoheriades
  - Stenosmia
  - Wainia
  - Xeroheriades
- Incertae Sedis
  - Neochalicodoma
  - Ochreriades
  - Stellenigris
