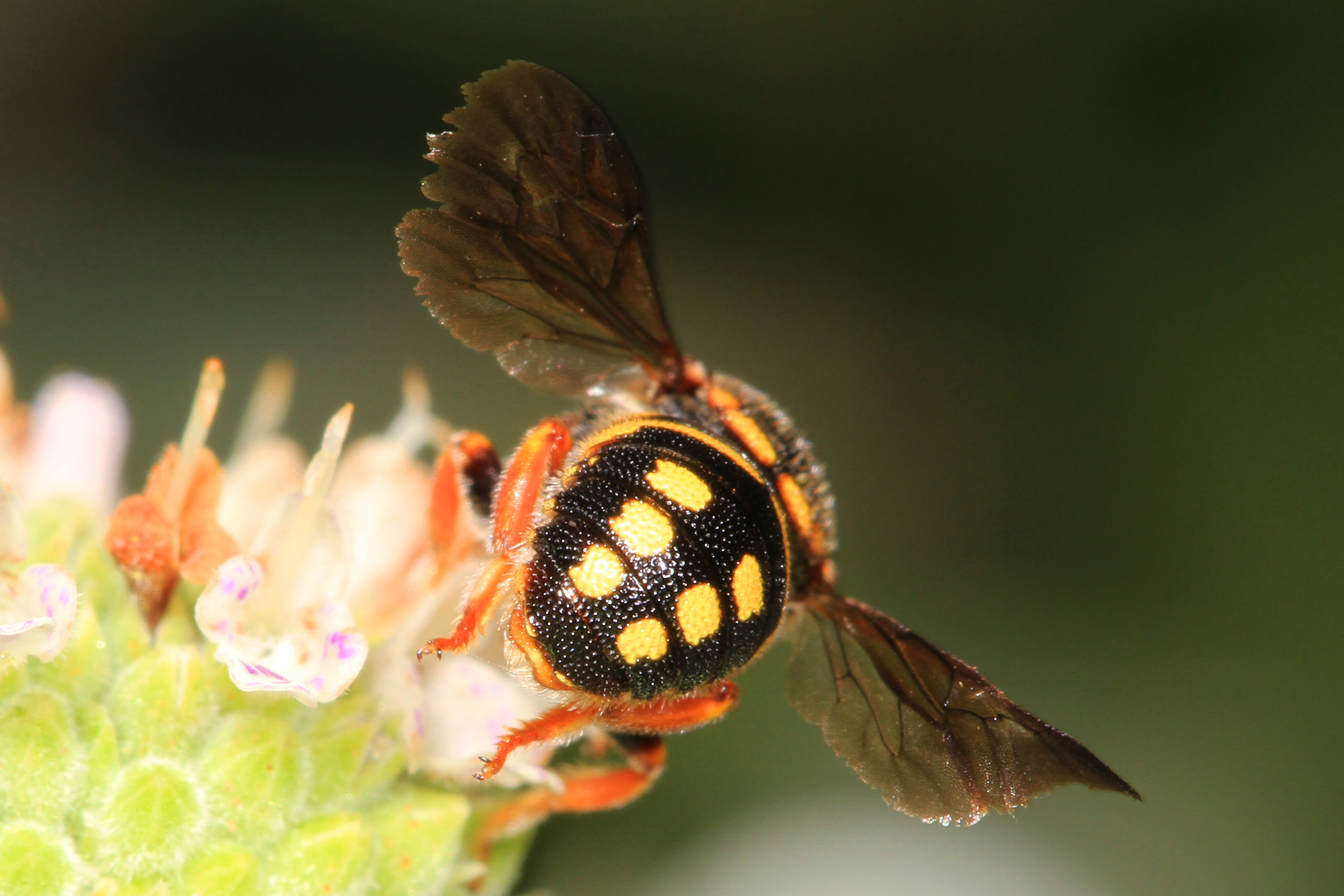
- Anthidiellum notatum

Scientific classification
- Kingdom: Animalia
- Phylum: Arthropoda
- Clade: Pancrustacea
- Class: Insecta
- Order: Hymenoptera
- Family: Megachilidae
- Subfamily: Megachilinae
- Tribe: Anthidiini; Ashmead, 1899

= Anthidiini =

Anthidiini Temporal range: Paleocene–Recent

Tribe of bees

Anthidiini is a tribe of insects in the family Megachilidae. There are at least 40 genera and 840 described species in Anthidiini. There is strong evidence that the tribe is monophyletic.

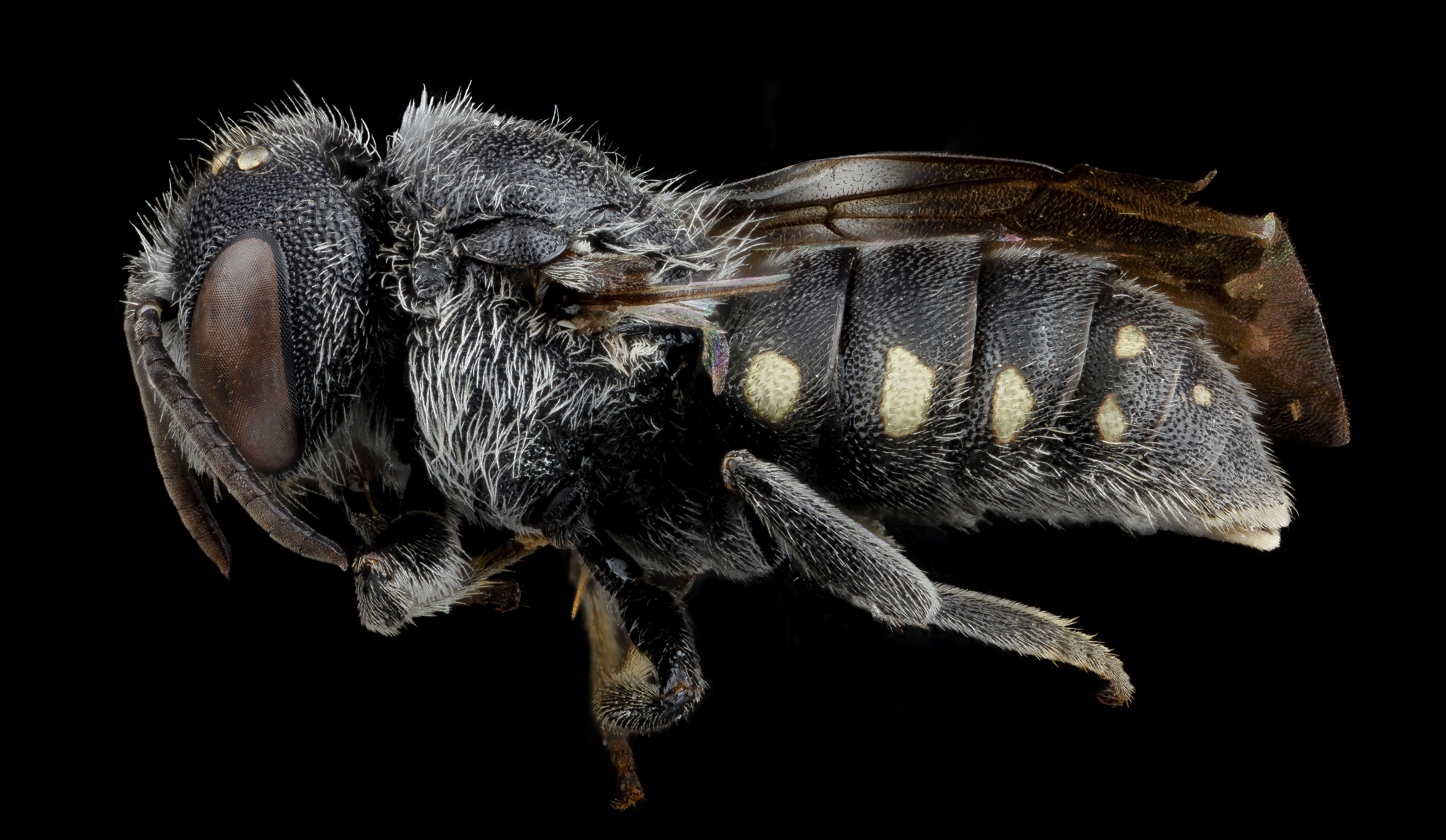
Stelis lateralis

== Genera ==
- Acedanthidium Michener, 2000
- Afranthidium Michener, 1948
- Afrostelis Cockerell, 1931
- Anthidiellum Cockerell, 1904 (rotund resin bees)
- Anthidioma Pasteels, 1984
- Anthidium Fabricius, 1804 (wool-carder bees)
- Anthodioctes Holmberg, 1903
- Apianthidium Pasteels, 1969
- Aspidosmia Brauns, 1926
- Austrostelis Michener & Griswold, 1994
- Aztecanthidium Michener & Ordway, 1964
- Bathanthidium Mavromoustakis, 1953
- Bekilia Benoist, 1962
- Benanthis Pasteels, 1969
- Cyphanthidium Pasteels, 1969
- Dianthidium Cockerell, 1900
- Duckeanthidium Moure & Hurd, 1960
- Eoanthidium Popov, 1950
- Epanthidium Moure, 1947
- Euaspis Gerstäcker, 1857
- Hoplostelis Dominique, 1898
- Hypanthidioides Moure, 1947
- Hypanthidium Cockerell, 1904
- Icteranthidium Michener, 1948
- Indanthidium Michener & Griswold, 1994
- Ketianthidium Urban, 2000
- Larinostelis Michener & Griswold, 1994
- Melostelis Urban, 2011
- Notanthidium Isensee, 1927
- Pachyanthidium Friese, 1905
- Paranthidium Cockerell & Cockerell, 1901
- Plesianthidium Cameron, 1905
- Pseudoanthidium Friese, 1898
- Rhodanthidium Isensee, 1927
- Serapista Cockerell, 1904
- Stelis Panzer, 1806
- †Tithonanthidium? Engel in Geier, 2026
- Trachusa Panzer, 1804
- Trachusoides Michener & Griswold, 1994
- Xenostelis Baker, 1999
