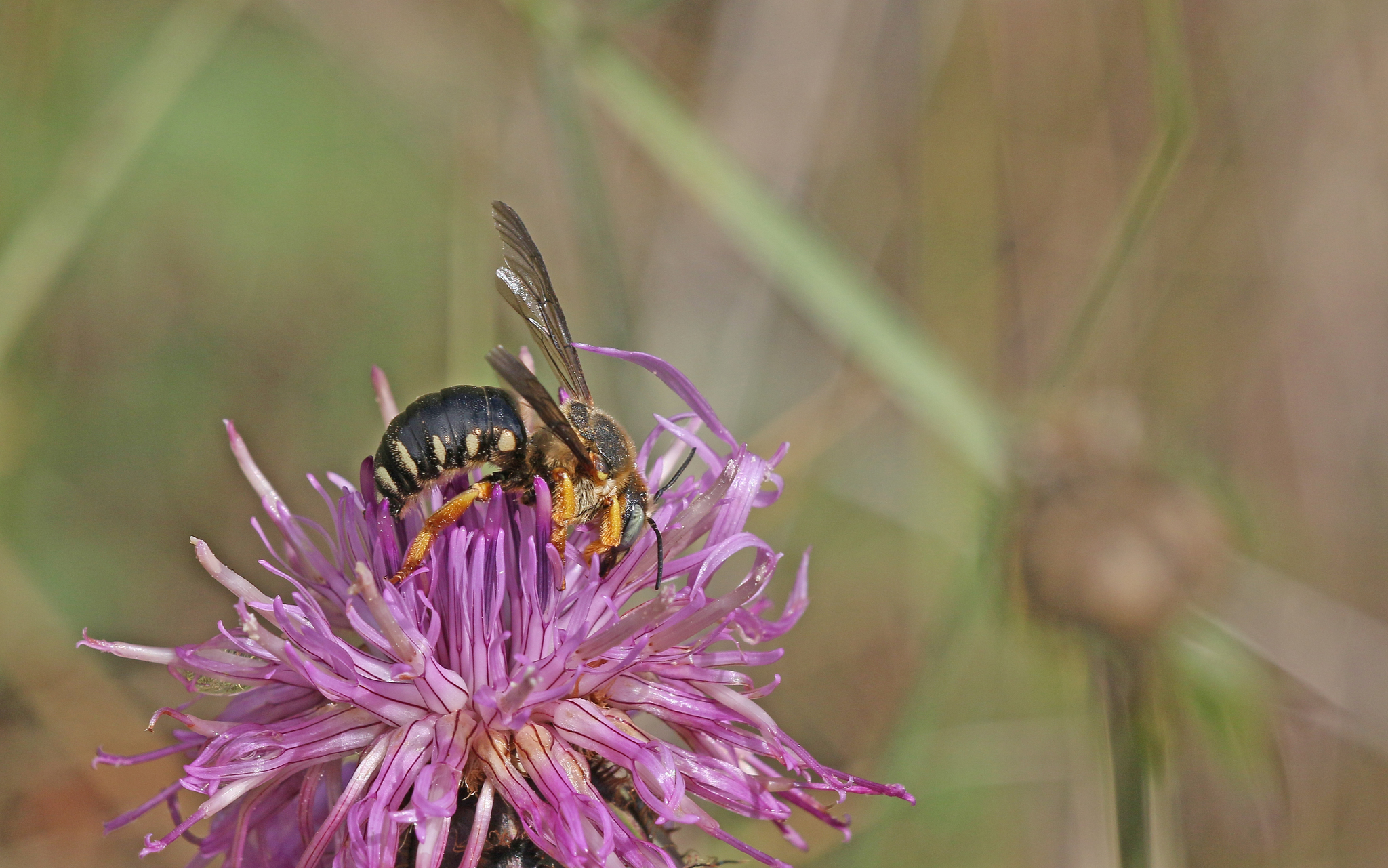
- Icteranthidium laterale, Brig, Valais, Switzerland

Scientific classification
- Kingdom: Animalia
- Phylum: Arthropoda
- Clade: Pancrustacea
- Class: Insecta
- Order: Hymenoptera
- Family: Megachilidae
- Subfamily: Megachilinae
- Tribe: Anthidiini
- Genus: Icteranthidium
- Species: I. laterale

Binomial name
- Icteranthidium laterale (Latreille, 1809)

Synonyms
- Anthidium laterale (Latreille, 1809); Proanthidium laterale (Latreille, 1809)

= Icteranthidium laterale =

Species of bee

Icteranthidium laterale, the lateral-spotted yellow-resin bee, is a species of bee from the family Megachilidae. 4e The origin of the name is from Latin "lateralis" meaning "concerning the side, side-", referring to the yellow patches on the sides of the abdomen. The habitat of the species is areas with a steppe character, and dry and warm locations, from the plains up to the mountain altitude.

They nest in cavities in the ground. A nest contains up to one dozen brood cells made entirely of resin. Their flight period is one generation from June to September.
