= Stenosmia tagmouta =

Scientific classification
- Domain: Eukaryota
- Kingdom: Animalia
- Phylum: Arthropoda
- Class: Insecta
- Order: Hymenoptera
- Family: Megachilidae
- Genus: Stenosmia
- Species: S. tagmouta

Binomial name
- Stenosmia tagmouta (Warncke, 1991)

Synonyms
- Hoplitis tagmouta Warncke, 1991

Species of bee

Stenosmia tagmouta is a species of bee, first discovered in 1991. No subspecies are listed in the Catalogue of Life.
