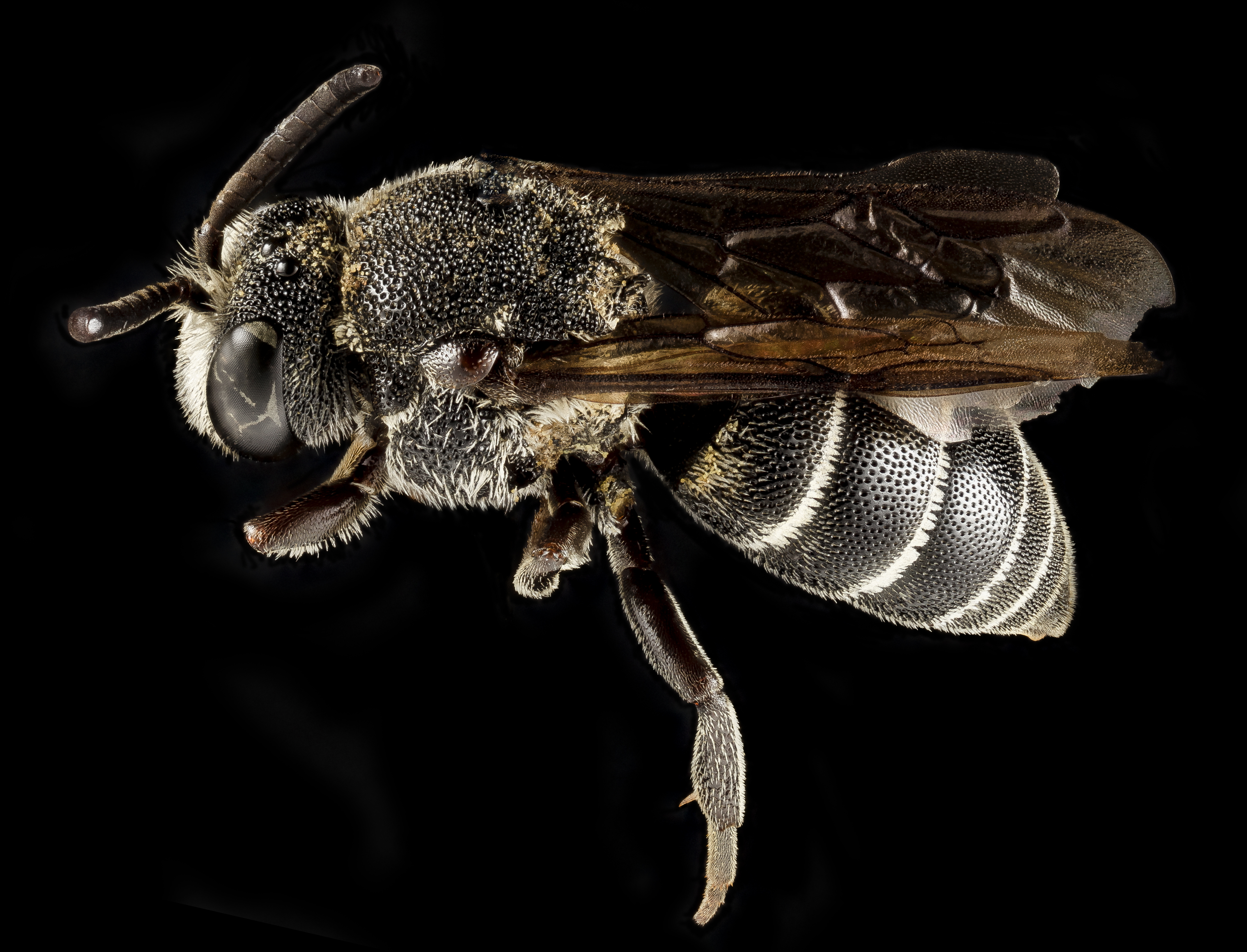

Scientific classification
- Kingdom: Animalia
- Phylum: Arthropoda
- Class: Insecta
- Order: Hymenoptera
- Family: Megachilidae
- Genus: Aglaoapis
- Species: A. tridentata

Binomial name
- Aglaoapis tridentata (Nylander, 1848)

= Aglaoapis tridentata =

Species of bee

Aglaoapis tridentata is a species of cuckoo bee belonging to the family Megachilidae.

It is native to Europe.
