= Pachyanthidium lachrymosum =

Scientific classification
- Domain: Eukaryota
- Kingdom: Animalia
- Phylum: Arthropoda
- Class: Insecta
- Order: Hymenoptera
- Family: Megachilidae
- Genus: Pachyanthidium
- Species: P. lachrymosum

Binomial name
- Pachyanthidium lachrymosum (Smith, 1879)

Species of bee

Pachyanthidium lachrymosum is a species of bee in the genus Pachyanthidium, of the family Megachilidae.
