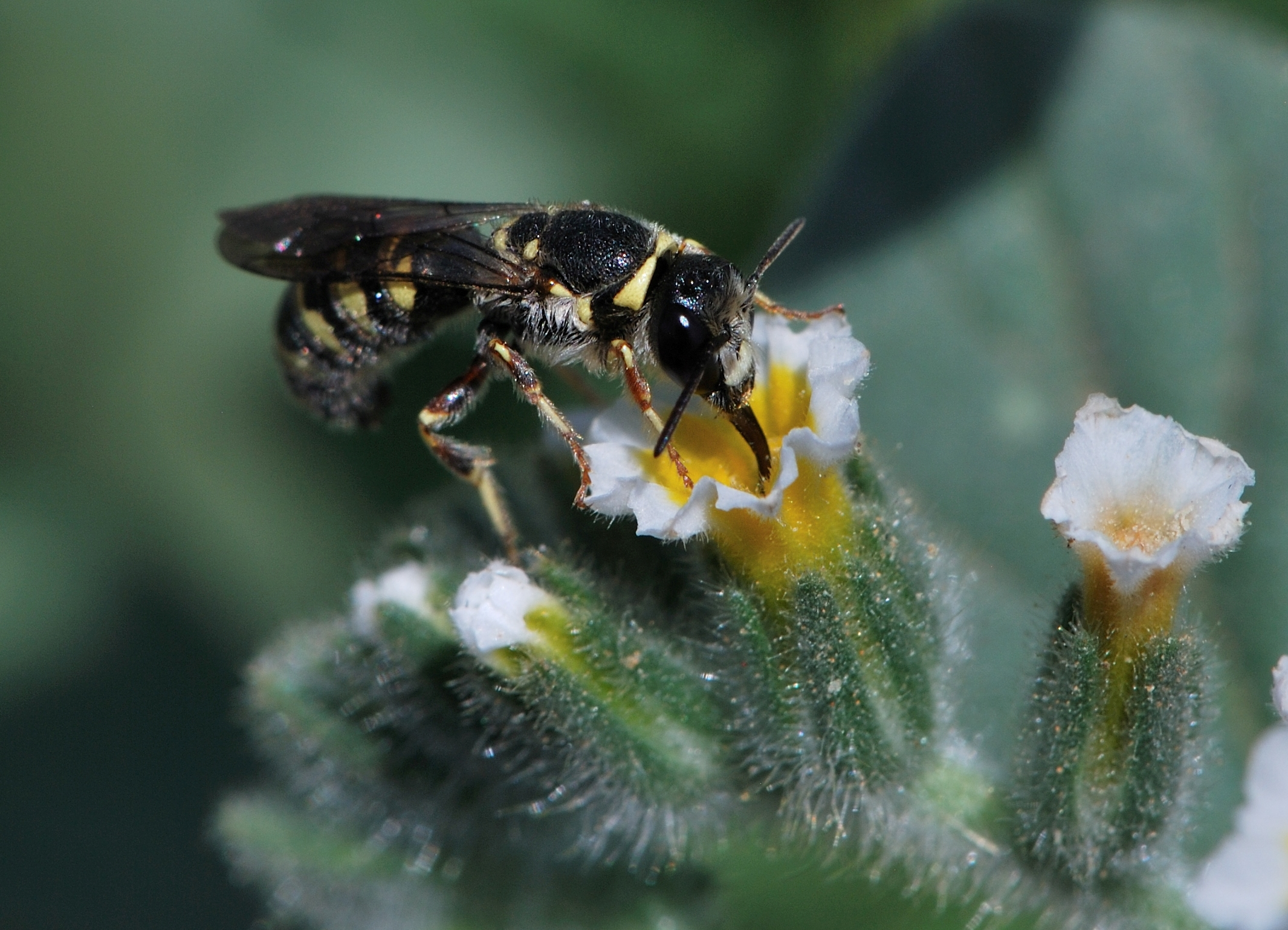
- Ochreriades fasciatus male foraging on Heliotropium

Scientific classification
- Domain: Eukaryota
- Kingdom: Animalia
- Phylum: Arthropoda
- Class: Insecta
- Order: Hymenoptera
- Family: Megachilidae
- Subfamily: Megachilinae
- Genus: Ochreriades; Mavromoustakis, 1956

= Ochreriades =

Genus of bees

Ochreriades is a genus within Megachilidae. This taxon has been considered the sister lineage "to a clade consisting of the “core” Osmiini, the tribe Megachilini and the genera Pseudoheriades and Afroheriades."

== Overview ==
Ochreriades contains only two species, which exhibit a "disjunct geographical distribution": Ocheriades fasciatus can be found in the deserts of the Middle East, while Ochreriades rozeni is limited to the deserts of southern Africa (in particular Namibia). It "exhibits a number of characters which distinguish it from other osmiines, including the presence of yellow or white integumental markings and an enlarged pronotum which eliminates both the preomaular surface and the anterior surface of the scutum."

Over the past decade, phylogenetic analyses have been able to demonstrate that the genus Ochreriades is not closely related to other osmiines or to any other tribe but rather constitutes a unique lineage within the subfamily Megachilinae. A molecular analysis of the tribe Osmiini concluded similarly that Ochreriades is only distantly related to other osmiines.

Ochreriades was considered related to other osmiines through the similar slender and elongate shape of its body, which is reminiscent of that of the osmiine genera Chelostoma and Heriades. Like Chelostoma and Heriades, Ochreriades "exhibits a long narrow abdomen; in contrast to these two genera, however, Ochreriades also exhibits an elongate thorax". The likely explanation for the slender, elongate body shape of Ochreriades is an adaptation to nesting in narrow openings, such as abandoned insect burrows or plant stems.

== Nesting biology ==
Ochreriades fasciatus "nests in beetle burrows in dead wood." Cell partitions and the nest plug are made of mud, probably with the addition of nectar. While the cell partitions exclusively consist of hardened mud, large pebbles are incorporated into the external surface of the nest plug.

== Flower preferences ==
Ochreriades exhibits oligolectic behavior with Lamiaceae.
