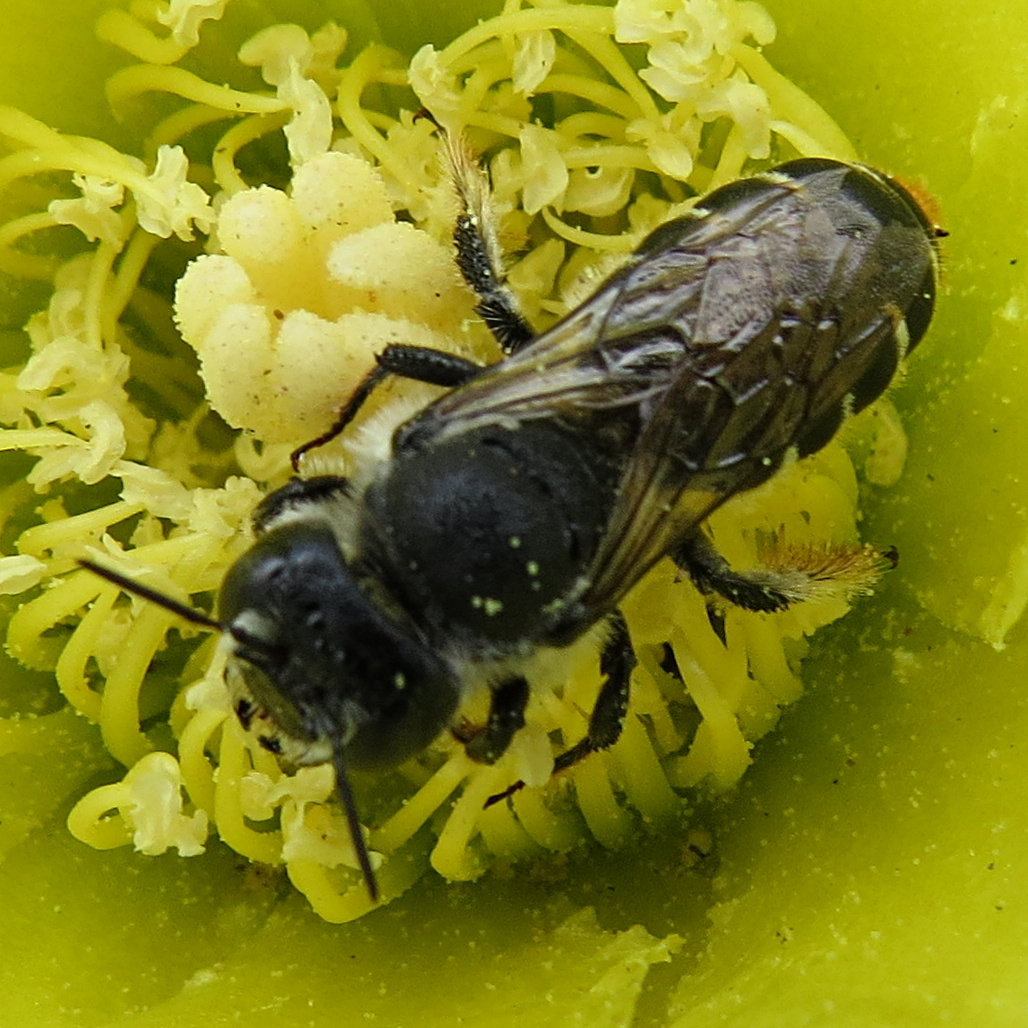

Scientific classification
- Kingdom: Animalia
- Phylum: Arthropoda
- Class: Insecta
- Order: Hymenoptera
- Family: Megachilidae
- Genus: Lithurgopsis
- Species: L. apicalis

Binomial name
- Lithurgopsis apicalis (Cresson, 1875)

Synonyms
- Lithurgus apicalis Cresson, 1875; Lithurgus apicalis var. opuntiae Cockerell, 1902; Lithurgus arizonensis Cockerell, 1937

= Lithurgopsis apicalis =

Species of bee

Lithurgopsis apicalis, the orange-tipped woodborer, is a species of woodborer bee in the family Megachilidae. Adults commonly visit flowers of Cactaceae, Malvaceae, and Asteraceae, with nests built in stalks of Agave.
