= Dioxys =

Dioxys may refer to:

- Dioxys (bee), a genus of bees in the family Megachilidae
- Dioxys (alga), a genus of algae in the family Characiopsidaceae
