= Euaspis edentata =

Scientific classification
- Kingdom: Animalia
- Phylum: Arthropoda
- Clade: Pancrustacea
- Class: Insecta
- Order: Hymenoptera
- Family: Megachilidae
- Genus: Euaspis
- Species: E. edentata

Binomial name
- Euaspis edentata Baker, 1995

Species of bee

Euaspis edentata is a species of leaf-cutting bee in the genus Euaspis, of the family Megachilidae. It is found from parts of India, and Sri Lanka.
