= Eoanthidium turnericum =

Scientific classification
- Kingdom: Animalia
- Phylum: Arthropoda
- Clade: Pancrustacea
- Class: Insecta
- Order: Hymenoptera
- Family: Megachilidae
- Genus: Eoanthidium
- Species: E. turnericum

Binomial name
- Eoanthidium turnericum (Mavromoustakis, 1934)

Synonyms
- Anthidiellum (Eoanthidium) turnericum (Mavromoustakis); Dianthidium turnericum Mavromoustakis, 1934

Species of bee

Eoanthidium turnericum is a species of bee in the genus Eoanthidium. It is endemic to Southern Africa.

== Ecology ==
Eoanthidium turnericum visits the flowers of Cleome, Indigofera, Codon schenckii and Justicia dregei.
