= Anthodioctes camargoi =

Scientific classification
- Domain: Eukaryota
- Kingdom: Animalia
- Phylum: Arthropoda
- Class: Insecta
- Order: Hymenoptera
- Family: Megachilidae
- Genus: Anthodioctes
- Species: A. camargoi

Binomial name
- Anthodioctes camargoi Urban, 1999

Species of bee

Anthodioctes camargoi is a species of bee discovered in 1999. No subspecies are listed at the Catalogue of Life.
