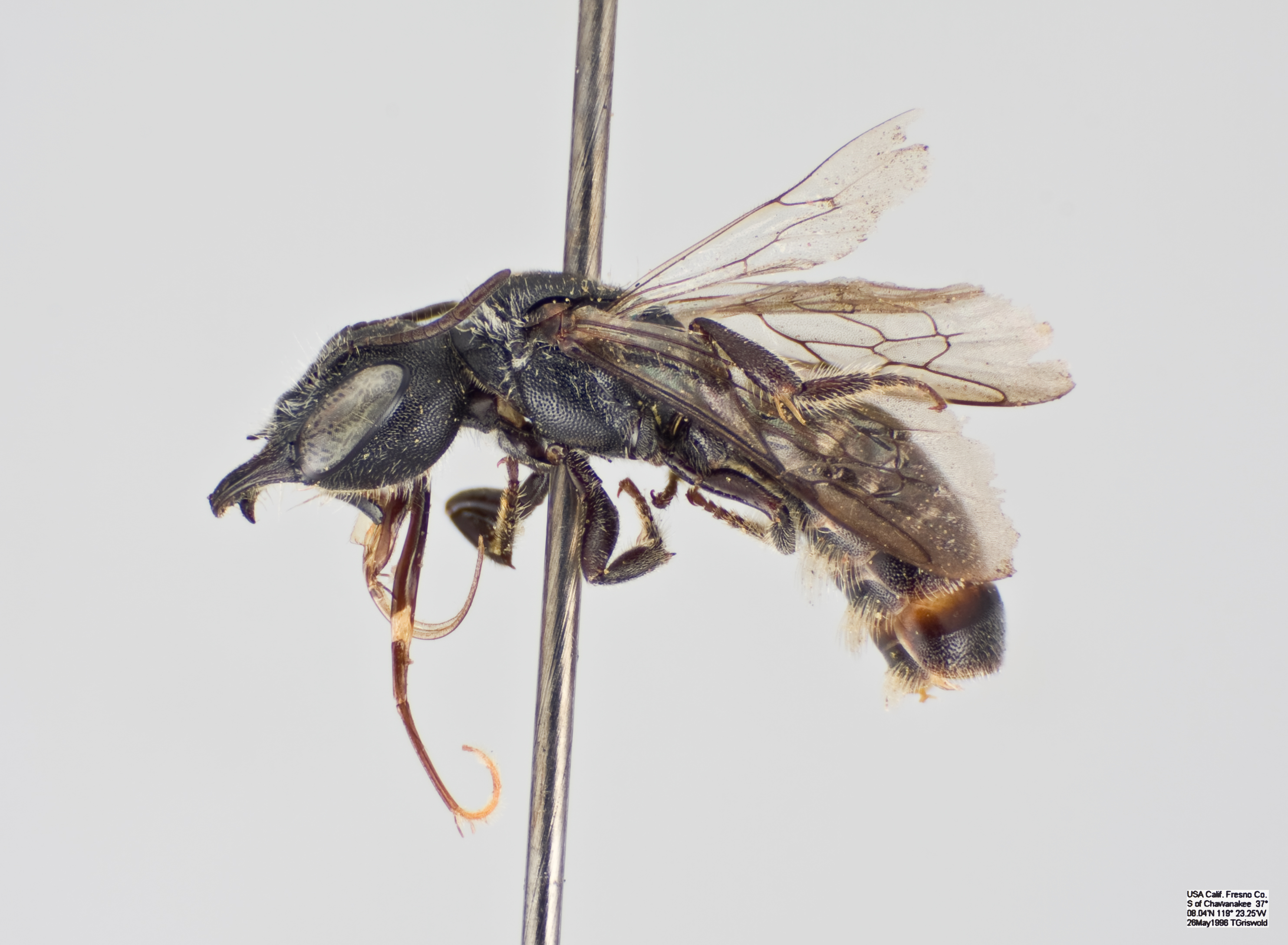
- Female Protosmia rubifloris

Scientific classification
- Kingdom: Animalia
- Phylum: Arthropoda
- Class: Insecta
- Order: Hymenoptera
- Family: Megachilidae
- Tribe: Osmiini
- Genus: Protosmia
- Species: P. rubifloris

Binomial name
- Protosmia rubifloris (Cockerell, 1898)

= Protosmia rubifloris =

Species of bee

Protosmia rubifloris is a species of bee in the family Megachilidae. It is found in Central America and North America.
