= Bathanthidium moganshanense =

Scientific classification
- Kingdom: Animalia
- Phylum: Arthropoda
- Clade: Pancrustacea
- Class: Insecta
- Order: Hymenoptera
- Family: Megachilidae
- Genus: Bathanthidium
- Species: B. moganshanense

Binomial name
- Bathanthidium moganshanense (Wu, 2004)

Synonyms
- Anthidium moganshanensis, Wu, 2004

Species of bee

Bathanthidium moganshanense is a species of bee in the family Megachilidae, the leaf-cutter, carder, or mason bees.

The species belongs to the genus Bathanthidium, which includes bees primarily distributed in Asia. Members of the family Megachilidae are known for their nesting behavior, often using plant material or resin to construct brood cells.
