= Bathanthidium bicolor =

Scientific classification
- Kingdom: Animalia
- Phylum: Arthropoda
- Clade: Pancrustacea
- Class: Insecta
- Order: Hymenoptera
- Family: Megachilidae
- Genus: Bathanthidium
- Species: B. bicolor

Binomial name
- Bathanthidium bicolor (Wu, 2004)

Synonyms
- Anthidium bicolor Wu, 2004

Species of bee

Bathanthidium bicolor is a species of bee in the family Megachilidae, the leaf-cutter, carder, or mason bees.
