= Bathanthidium barkamense =

Scientific classification
- Kingdom: Animalia
- Phylum: Arthropoda
- Clade: Pancrustacea
- Class: Insecta
- Order: Hymenoptera
- Family: Megachilidae
- Genus: Bathanthidium
- Species: B. barkamense

Binomial name
- Bathanthidium barkamense (Wu, 1986)

Synonyms
- Dianthidium barkamensis Wu, 1986

Species of bee

Bathanthidium barkamense is a species of bee in the family Megachilidae, the leaf-cutter, carder, or mason bees.
