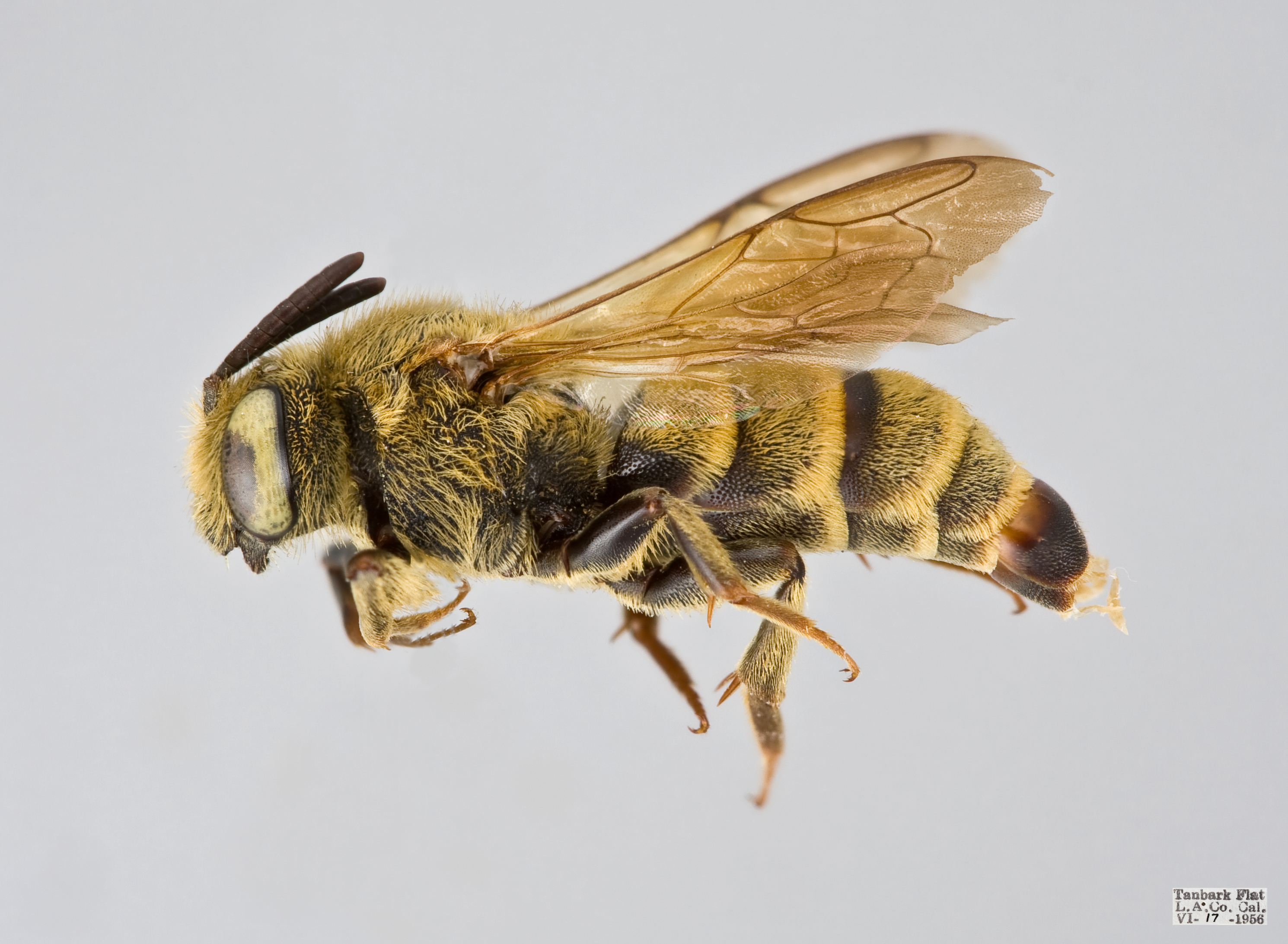
- Dioxys aurifuscus

Scientific classification
- Domain: Eukaryota
- Kingdom: Animalia
- Phylum: Arthropoda
- Class: Insecta
- Order: Hymenoptera
- Family: Megachilidae
- Subfamily: Megachilinae
- Tribe: Dioxyini

= Dioxyini =

Tribe of bees

Dioxyini is a tribe of cuckoo bees in the family Megachilidae. There are eight genera in Dioxyini, comprising 36 species.

== Genera ==
- Aglaoapis Cameron, 1901
- Allodioxys Popov, 1947
- Dioxys Lepeletier & Serville, 1825
- Ensliniana Alfken, 1938
- Eudioxys Mavromoustakis, 1963
- Metadioxys Popov, 1947
- Paradioxys Mocsáry, 1894
- Prodioxys Friese, 1914
