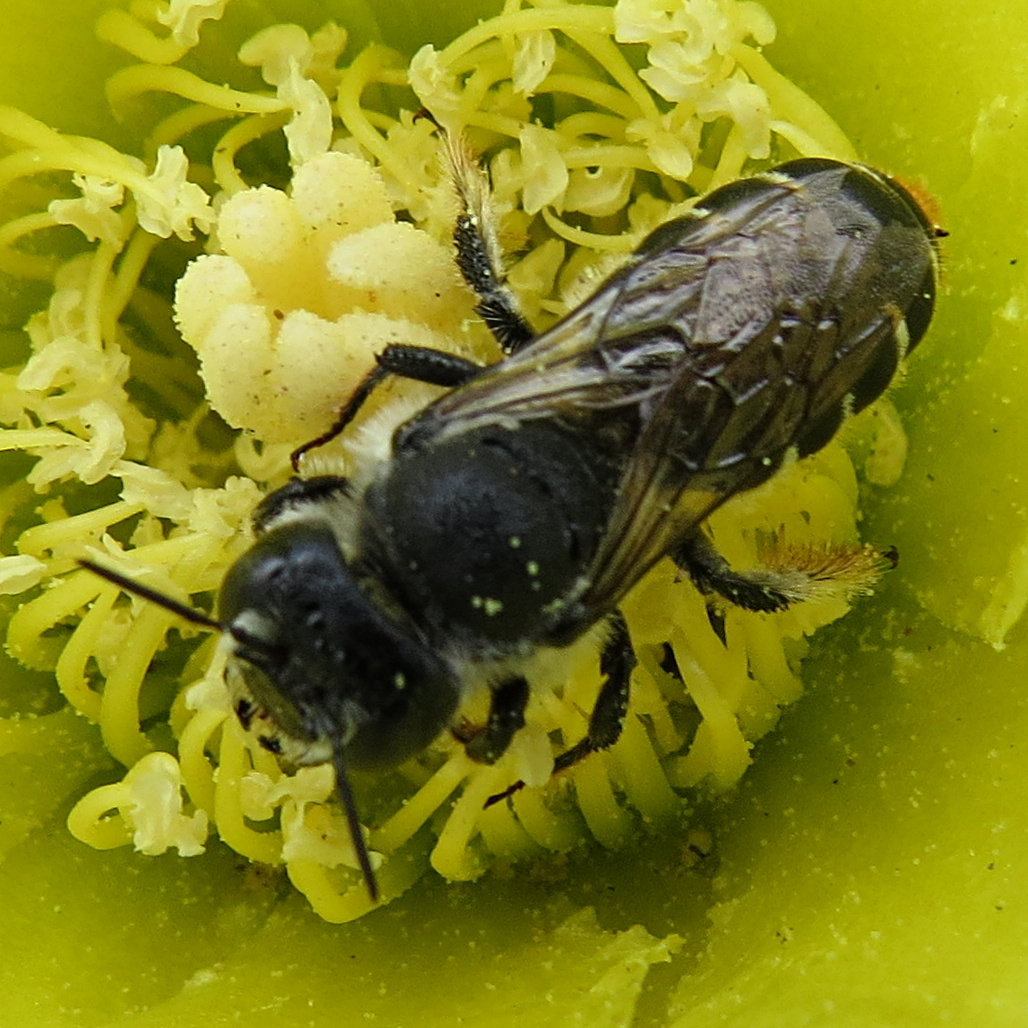
- Lithurgopsis apicalis

Scientific classification
- Domain: Eukaryota
- Kingdom: Animalia
- Phylum: Arthropoda
- Class: Insecta
- Order: Hymenoptera
- Family: Megachilidae
- Subfamily: Lithurginae
- Genus: Lithurgopsis; Fox, 1902

= Lithurgopsis =

Genus of bees

Lithurgopsis is a genus of northern cactus woodborers in the family Megachilidae. There are at least nine described species in Lithurgopsis.

== Species ==
These species belong to the genus Lithurgopsis.

- Lithurgopsis antilleorum (Michener, 1988)
- Lithurgopsis apicalis (Cresson, 1875)
- Lithurgopsis bitorulosa (Snelling, 1986)
- Lithurgopsis echinocacti (Cockerell, 1898)
- Lithurgopsis gibbosa (Smith, 1853)
- Lithurgopsis listrota (Snelling, 1983)
- Lithurgopsis littoralis (Cockerell, 1917)
- Lithurgopsis planifrons (Friese, 1908)
- Lithurgopsis rufiventris (Friese, 1908)
