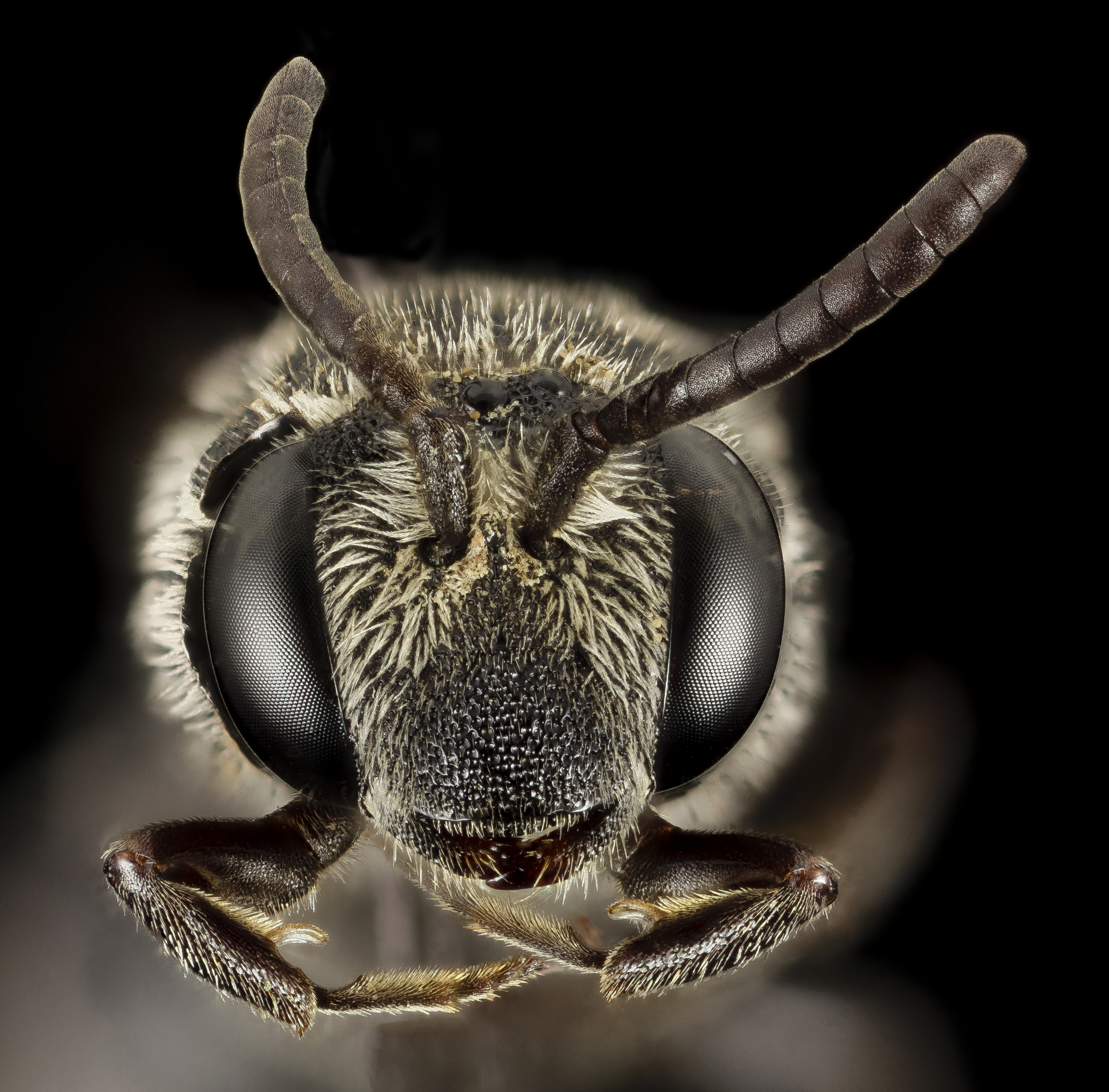
- Aglaoapis tridentata, Austria

Scientific classification
- Domain: Eukaryota
- Kingdom: Animalia
- Phylum: Arthropoda
- Class: Insecta
- Order: Hymenoptera
- Clade: Anthophila
- Family: Megachilidae
- Subfamily: Megachilinae
- Tribe: Dioxyini
- Genus: Aglaoapis; Cameron, 1901

Synonyms
- Dioxoides Popov, 1947

= Aglaoapis =

Genus of bees

Aglaoapis is a genus of cuckoo bee belonging to the family Megachilidae.

The genus was first described by P. Cameron in 1901.

== Species ==
- Aglaoapis alata (Michener, 1996)
- Aglaoapis brevipennis Cameron, 1901
- Aglaoapis tridentata (Nylander, 1848)
