= Ensliniana =

Scientific classification
- Kingdom: Animalia
- Phylum: Arthropoda
- Clade: Pancrustacea
- Class: Insecta
- Order: Hymenoptera
- Family: Megachilidae
- Subfamily: Megachilinae
- Tribe: Dioxyini
- Genus: Ensliniana; Alfken, 1938
- Species: E. bidentata

Binomial name
- Ensliniana bidentata (Friese, 1899)

Synonyms
- Stelis bidentata Friese, 1899; Paradioxys pannonica v. rufipes Friese, 1899 (Preocc.); Dioxys richaensis Friese, 1911; Dioxys bidentata Friese, 1924 (Preocc.); Dioxys gussakovskyi Popov, 1936; Ensliniana cuspidata Alfken, 1938; Dioxys (Ensliniana) bidentata anatolica Heinrich, 1977

Genus of bees

The cuckoo bee genus Ensliniana contains only one species, Ensliniana bidentata, which is found in the Mediterranean and Middle East.
