= Eoanthidium =

Scientific classification
- Kingdom: Animalia
- Phylum: Arthropoda
- Class: Insecta
- Order: Hymenoptera
- Family: Megachilidae
- Subfamily: Megachilinae
- Tribe: Anthidiini
- Genus: Eoanthidium; Popov, 1950

Genus of bees

Eoanthidium is a genus of bees in the Megachilidae family.

== Description ==
Eoanthidium generally have elongate, slender bodies with black integument and yellow maculations. Their body length ranges from 6–10 mm.

== Distribution ==
Eoanthidium occurs in the eastern Mediterranean, southwestern Asia, southern Russia, southern India, Pakistan, and Africa.

== Taxonomy ==
Eoanthidium contains the following 4 subgenera:

- Clistanthidium
- Eoanthidium
- Hemidiellum
- Salemanthidium

== Species ==
Eoanthidium contains at least 17 species:

- Eoanthidium adentatum Gupta & Simlote, 1993
- Eoanthidium arabicum Pasteels, 1980
- Eoanthidium armaticeps (Friese, 1908)
- Eoanthidium bakerorum Engel, 2004
- Eoanthidium bituberculatum (Pasteels, 1984)
- Eoanthidium chinense (Wu, 1962)
- Eoanthidium clypeare (Morawitz, 1873)
- Eoanthidium (Eoanthidium) hoplostomum (Mavromoustakis, 1945)
- Eoanthidium insulare (Morawitz, 1873)
- Eoanthidium judaeense (Mavromoustakis, 1945)
- Eoanthidium nasicum (Friese, 1917)
- Eoanthidium pictipenne Pasteels, 1972
- Eoanthidium punjabense Gupta & Sharma, 1993
- Eoanthidium rothschildi (Vachal, 1909)
- Eoanthidium salemense (Cockerell, 1919)
- Eoanthidium semicarinatum Pasteels, 1972
- Eoanthidium tricolor Pasteels, 1972
- Eoanthidium turnericum (Mavromoustakis, 1934)
