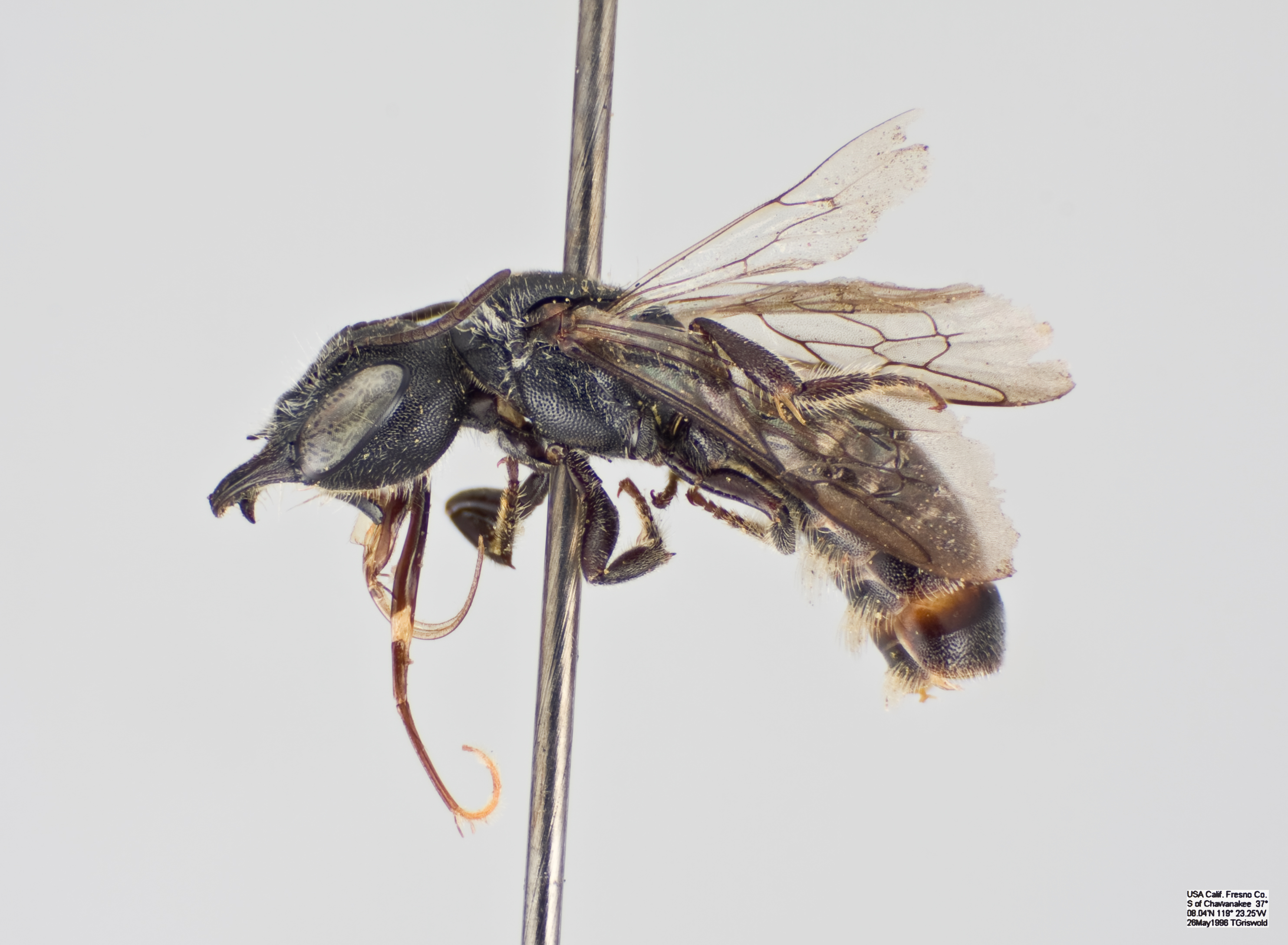

Scientific classification
- Domain: Eukaryota
- Kingdom: Animalia
- Phylum: Arthropoda
- Class: Insecta
- Order: Hymenoptera
- Family: Megachilidae
- Subfamily: Megachilinae
- Tribe: Osmiini
- Genus: Protosmia; Ducke, 1900

= Protosmia =

Genus of bees

Protosmia is a genus of subgenus Chelostomopsis in the family Megachilidae. There are more than 30 described species in Protosmia.

== Species ==
These 31 species belong to the genus Protosmia:

- Protosmia asensioi Griswold & Parker, 1987
- Protosmia burmanica (Bingham, 1897)
- Protosmia capitata (Schletterer, 1889)
- Protosmia decipiens (Benoist, 1935)
- Protosmia devia Tkalcu, 1978
- Protosmia exenterata (Pérez, 1896)
- Protosmia glutinosa (Giraud, 1871)
- Protosmia hamulifera Griswold, 2013
- Protosmia humeralis (Pérez, 1896)
- Protosmia judaica (Mavromoustakis, 1948)
- Protosmia limbata (Benoist, 1935)
- Protosmia longiceps (Friese, 1899)
- Protosmia luctuosa (Lucas, 1848)
- Protosmia magnicapitis (Stanek, 1969)
- Protosmia megaceps (Kohl, 1906)
- Protosmia minutula (Pérez, 1896)
- Protosmia monstrosa (Pérez, 1895)
- Protosmia montana
- Protosmia octomaculata (Pérez, 1895)
- Protosmia paradoxa (Friese, 1899)
- Protosmia pulex (Benoist, 1935)
- Protosmia querquedula van der Zanden, 1994
- Protosmia rubifloris (Cockerell, 1898)
- Protosmia schwarzi Griswold, 2013
- Protosmia sicula (Dalla Torre & Friese, 1895)
- Protosmia sideritis Tkalcu, 1978
- Protosmia stelidoides (Pérez, 1895)
- Protosmia stigmatica (Pérez, 1895)
- Protosmia tauricola Popov, 1961
- Protosmia tiflensis (Morawitz, 1876)
- Protosmia trifida Griswold, 2013
