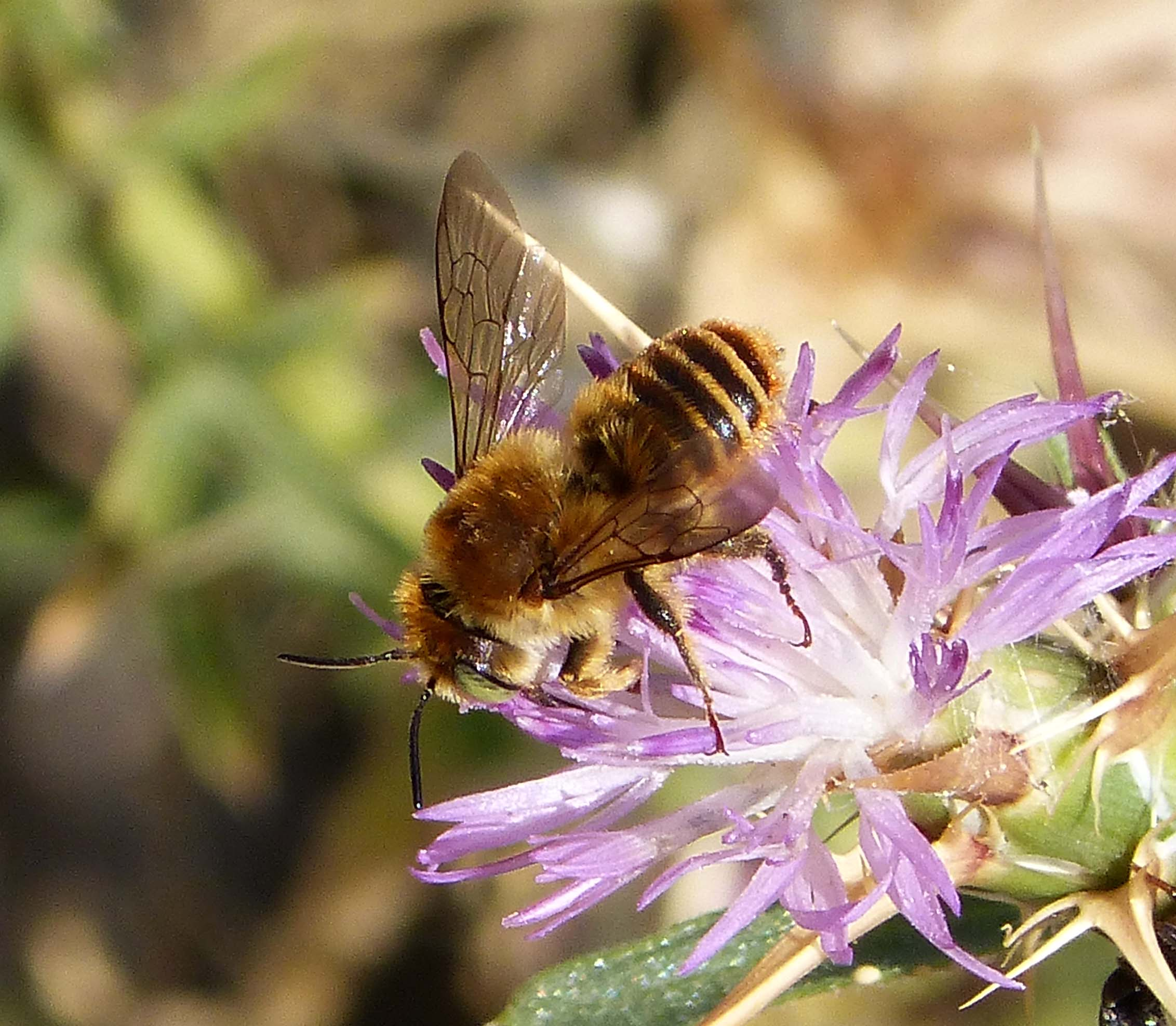
- Lithurgus chrysurus

Scientific classification
- Kingdom: Animalia
- Phylum: Arthropoda
- Clade: Pancrustacea
- Class: Insecta
- Order: Hymenoptera
- Family: Megachilidae
- Subfamily: Lithurginae; Newman, 1834

= Lithurginae =

Lithurginae Temporal range: Eocene–Recent

Subfamily of bees

Lithurginae is a subfamily of woodborer bees in the family Megachilidae.

== Genera ==
These extant genera belong to the subfamily Lithurginae:

- Lithurgini
  - Austrothurgus
  - Lithurgopsis^{b} (northern cactus woodborers)
  - Lithurgus Berthold, 1827^{i c g b}
  - Microthurge Michener, 1983^{i c g}
  - Trichothurgus Moure, 1949^{i c g}

Data sources: i = ITIS, c = Catalogue of Life, g = GBIF, b = Bugguide.net

The extinct genus Protolithurgus Engel, 2001 is placed in its own tribe Protolithurgiini, sister to Lithurgini within Lithurginae.
