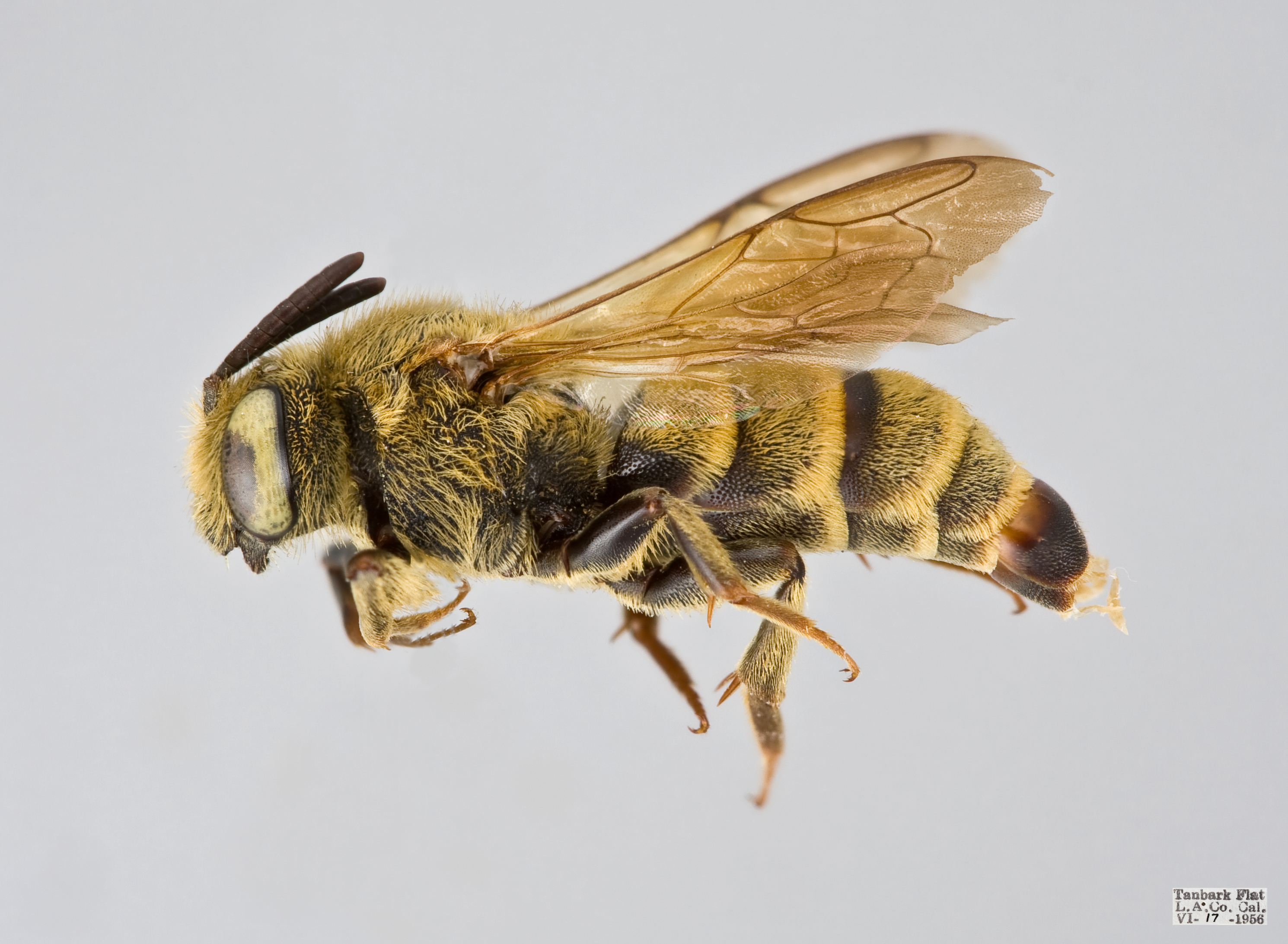
- Dioxys aurifuscus

Scientific classification
- Kingdom: Animalia
- Phylum: Arthropoda
- Class: Insecta
- Order: Hymenoptera
- Clade: Anthophila
- Family: Megachilidae
- Subfamily: Megachilinae
- Tribe: Dioxyini
- Genus: Dioxys; Lepeletier & Serville, 1825

Synonyms
- Hoplopasites Ashmead, 1898; Chrysopheon Titus, 1901

= Dioxys (bee) =

Genus of bees

Dioxys is a genus of cuckoo bees belonging to the family Megachilidae.

The species of this genus are found in Europe and North America.

== Species ==
- Dioxys ardens Gerstäcker, 1869
- Dioxys atlanticus Saunders, 1904
- Dioxys aurifuscus (Titus, 1901)
- Dioxys chalicoda Lucas, 1849
- Dioxys cinctus (Jurine, 1807)
- Dioxys distinguendus Popov, 1936
- Dioxys heinrichi Warncke, 1977
- Dioxys lanzarotensis Tkalcu, 2001
- Dioxys modestus Popov, 1936
- Dioxys moestus Costa, 1883
- Dioxys montanus Heinrich, 1977
- Dioxys pacificus Cockerell, 1916
- Dioxys pomonae Cockerell, 1910
- Dioxys productus (Cresson, 1879)
- Dioxys pumilus Gerstäcker, 1869
- Dioxys rohweri Cockerell, 1908
- Dioxys rufipes Morawitz, 1875
- Dioxys turkestanicus Popov, 1936
