= Klaus Warncke =

German schoolteacher and zoologist

Klaus Warncke (14 June 1937 – 2 January 1993) was a German schoolteacher, zoologist and entomologist who specialized in the Hymenoptera. He took a special interest in the genus Andrena of the Palearctic.

Warncke was born in Neustrelitz, the second of four children of physician Kurt and Thusnelda née Schröter. The family moved to Samtredia near Posen in 1939 and moved in 1945 to Mecklenburg, Berlin and finally settled in Braunschweig in 1952. After graduating from high school in 1958 he went to study in Mainz followed by studies in Freiburg and Munich. He received his doctorate in 1964 with studies on Aconitum lycoctonum. He travelled in Iceland, Italy, and Spain, taking an interest in ornithology. He married Ulrike Winklat-Zedtwitz in 1964 and they had a son. He became a teacher in Munich and Vilshofen, later at Hilpoltstein and Schrobenhausen. From 1970 he taught at Dachau dealing mainly with biology and geography. He made his students study bees and other wild fauna in the field as part of studies. In 1961 he was advised by Walter Forster of the zoological collections at Munich to study the genus Andrena as it was very poorly studied. Warncke then spent 30 years examining these and other related genera. In 1964 he began to make trips to Anatolia to collect specimens. Along with Robert Wilhelm Grünwaldt, he also collected in Greece. He wrote several papers on the genera Andrena, Rophites, Anthidium, Halictus, Pasites, Osmia, Sphecodes, Coelioxys and Stelis. He described nearly 57 new higher level taxa (mostly subgenus level) and 887 species.

Warncke and his second wife Christa were killed in a car accident in Cairo.
