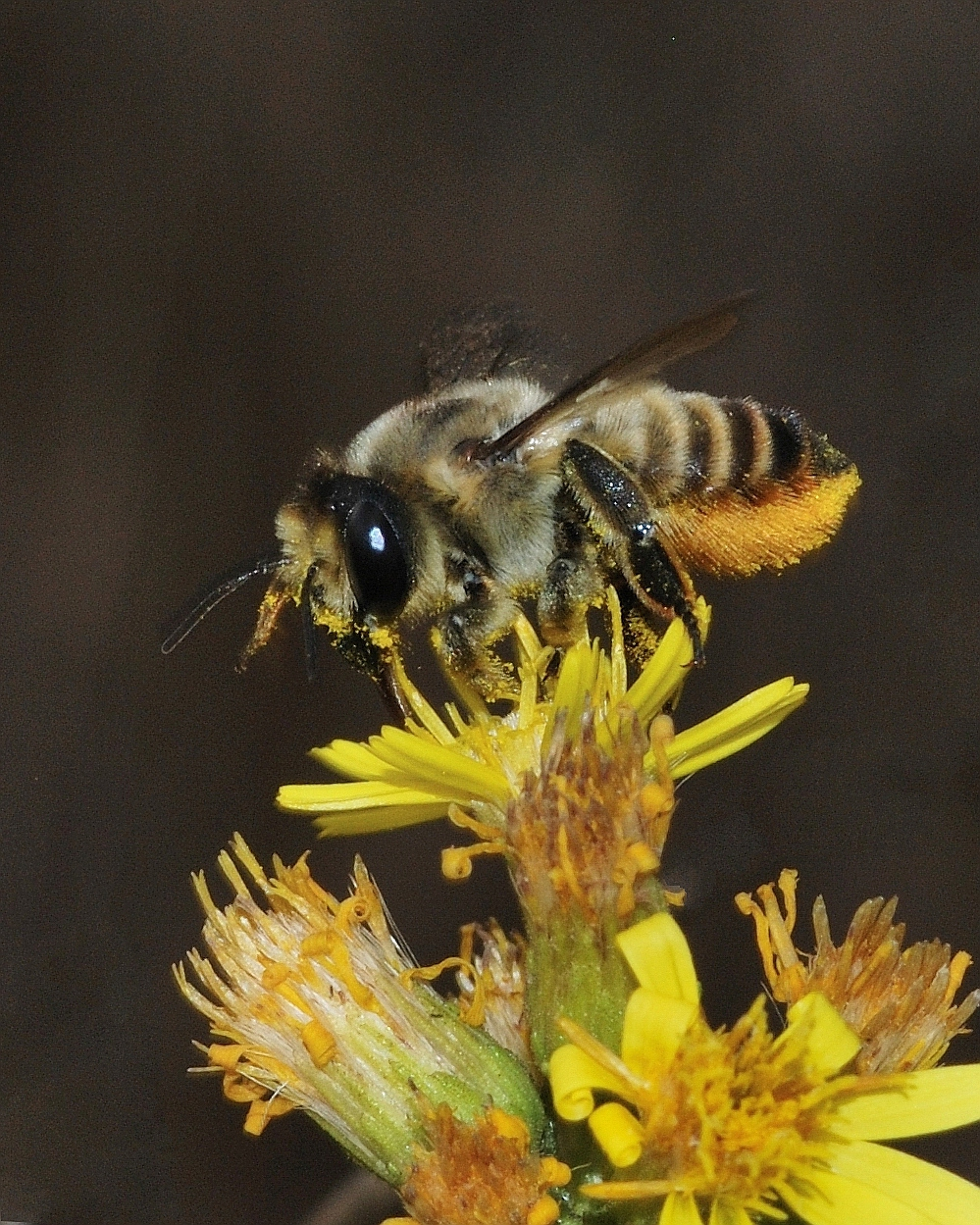
- Megachile lagopoda

Scientific classification
- Kingdom: Animalia
- Phylum: Arthropoda
- Clade: Pancrustacea
- Class: Insecta
- Order: Hymenoptera
- Family: Megachilidae
- Subfamily: Megachilinae
- Tribe: Megachilini; Latreille, 1802

= Megachilini =

Tribe of insects

Megachilini is a tribe of leaf-cutter and resin bees.

Megachilini is the most speciose tribe in Megachilidae. The phylogenetic relationships within and between its genera are still obscure, despite its high diversity.

== Genera ==
- Alocanthedon Engel and Gonzalez
- Boreocoelioxys Mitchell
- Callomegachile Michener
- Chelostomoides Robertson
- Coelioxys Latreille, 1809
- Creightonella Cockerell, 1908
- Cyrtocoelioxys Mitchell
- Gronoceras Cockerell, 1907
- Heriadopsis Cockerell, 1931
- Liothyrapis Cockerell, 1911
- Matangapis Baker & Engel, 2006
- Megachile Latreille, 1802
- Noteriades Cockerell, 1931
- Radoszkowskiana Popov, 1955
- Rozenapis Gonzalez & Engel, 2019
- Saucrochile Gonzalez & Engel, 2019
- Synocoelioxys Mitchell
- Xanthosarus Robertson
- Xerocoelioxys Latreille
