= Stenosmia =

Scientific classification
- Domain: Eukaryota
- Kingdom: Animalia
- Phylum: Arthropoda
- Class: Insecta
- Order: Hymenoptera
- Family: Megachilidae
- Tribe: Osmiini
- Genus: Stenosmia; Michener, 1941

Genus of bees

Stenosmia is a genus of bees belonging to the family Megachilidae.

Species:

- Stenosmia albatera (Warncke, 1991)
- Stenosmia aravensis Zanden, 1992
- Stenosmia denticulata Zanden, 1992
- Stenosmia flavicornis (Morawitz, 1878)
- Stenosmia hartliebi (Friese, 1899)
- Stenosmia jordanica (Warncke, 1991)
- Stenosmia kotschisa (Warncke, 1991)
- Stenosmia minima (von Schulthess, 1924)
- Stenosmia tagmouta (Warncke, 1991)
- Stenosmia xinjiangensis Wu, 2004
