= Hypanthidium =

Scientific classification
- Kingdom: Animalia
- Phylum: Arthropoda
- Class: Insecta
- Order: Hymenoptera
- Family: Megachilidae
- Tribe: Anthidiini
- Genus: Hypanthidium; Cockerell, 1904

Genus of bees

Hypanthidium is a genus of bees belonging to the family Megachilidae.

The species of this genus are found in South America.

Species:

- Hypanthidium beniense Cockerell, 1927
- Hypanthidium buchwaldi (Friese, 1904)
- Hypanthidium cacerense Urban, 1997
- Hypanthidium costaricense (Friese, 1917)
- Hypanthidium dentiventre (Friese, 1904)
- Hypanthidium divaricatum (Smith, 1854)
- Hypanthidium dressleri Urban, 1997
- Hypanthidium duckei Urban, 1997
- Hypanthidium ecuadorium (Friese, 1904)
- Hypanthidium fabricianum Moure, 1960
- Hypanthidium foveolatum (Alfken, 1930)
- Hypanthidium magdalenae Urban, 1997
- Hypanthidium maranhense Urban, 1997
- Hypanthidium melanopterum Cockerell, 1917
- Hypanthidium mexicanum (Cresson, 1878)
- Hypanthidium nigritulum Urban, 1997
- Hypanthidium obscurius Schrottky, 1908
- Hypanthidium taboganum Cockerell, 1917
- Hypanthidium tuberigaster (Urban, 1994)
- Hypanthidium yucatanicum Cockerell, 1931
