= Bathanthidium =

Scientific classification
- Kingdom: Animalia
- Phylum: Arthropoda
- Class: Insecta
- Order: Hymenoptera
- Family: Megachilidae
- Genus: Bathanthidium; Mavromoustakis, 1953

Genus of bees

Bathanthidium is a genus of bees belonging to the family Megachilidae. The species of this genus are found in Southeastern Asia.

== Species ==
- Bathanthidium atriceps (Morawitz, 1890)
- Bathanthidium barkamense (Wu, 1986)
- Bathanthidium bicolor (Wu, 2004)
- Bathanthidium bifoveolatum (Alfken, 1937)
- Bathanthidium binghami (Friese, 1901)
- Bathanthidium concavum (Wu, 1962)
- Bathanthidium emeiense Wu, 2004
- Bathanthidium fengkaiense Niu & Zhu, 2019
- Bathanthidium hainanense Niu, Wu & Zhu, 2012
- Bathanthidium malaisei (Popov, 1941)
- Bathanthidium moganshanense (Wu, 2004)
- Bathanthidium rubopunctatum (Wu, 1993)
- Bathanthidium sibiricum (Eversmann, 1852)
