= Euaspis =

Scientific classification
- Domain: Eukaryota
- Kingdom: Animalia
- Phylum: Arthropoda
- Class: Insecta
- Order: Hymenoptera
- Family: Megachilidae
- Genus: Euaspis; Gerstaecker, 1858

Genus of bees

Euaspis is a genus of cuckoo bees belonging to the family Megachilidae.

The species of this genus are found in Africa and Southeastern Asia.

Species:

- Euaspis abdominalis (Fabricius, 1793)
- Euaspis aequicarinata Pasteels, 1980
- Euaspis basalis (Ritsema, 1874)
- Euaspis carbonaria (Smith, 1854)
- Euaspis diversicarinata Pasteels, 1980
- Euaspis edentata Baker, 1995
- Euaspis erythros (Meunier, 1890)
- Euaspis lorenzae Baker, 1995
- Euaspis polynesia Vachal, 1903
- Euaspis strandi Meyer, 1922
- Euaspis trilobata Pasteels, 1980
- Euaspis wegneri Baker, 1995
