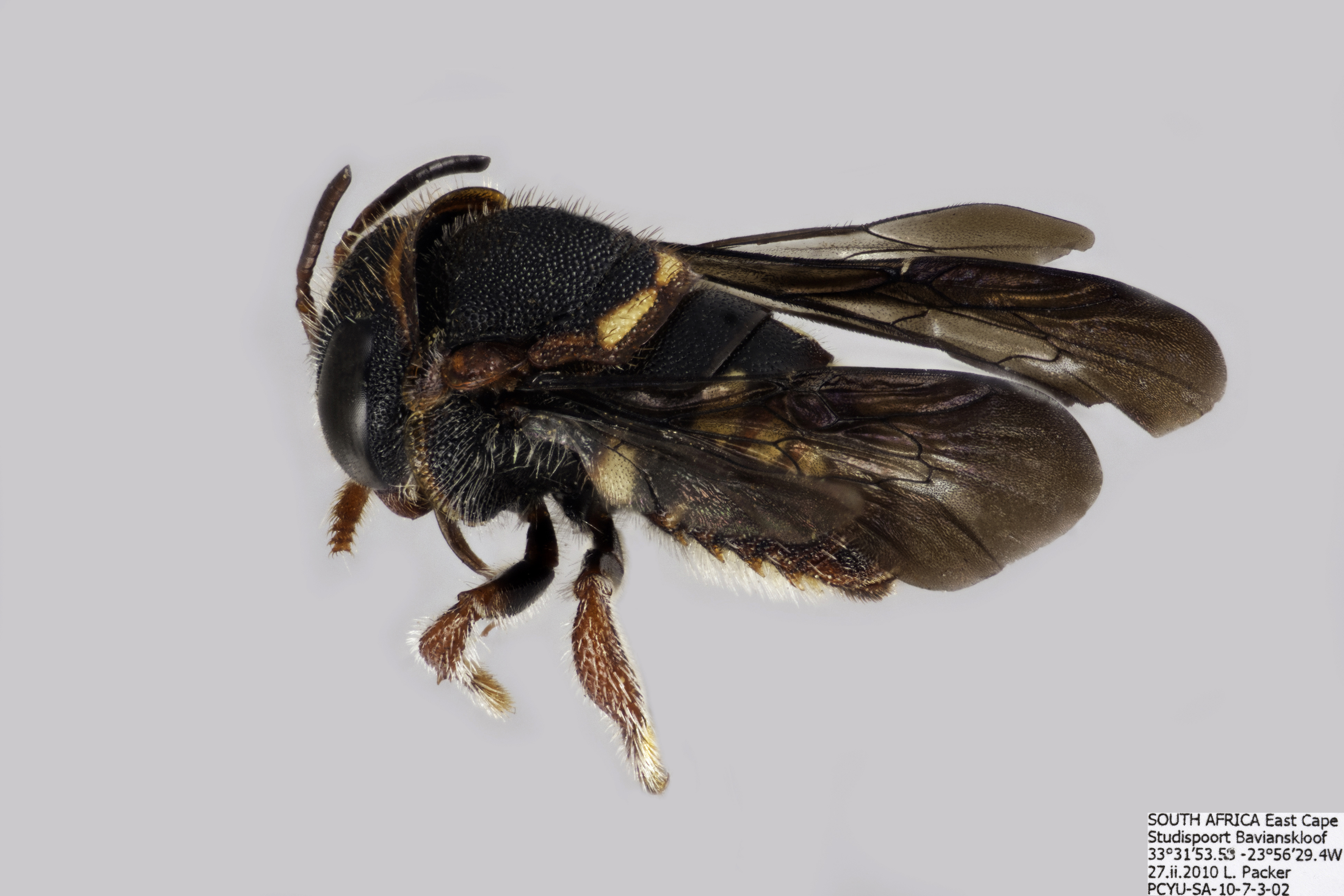
- Pachyanthidium

Scientific classification
- Kingdom: Animalia
- Phylum: Arthropoda
- Clade: Pancrustacea
- Class: Insecta
- Order: Hymenoptera
- Family: Megachilidae
- Genus: Pachyanthidium; Friese, 1905

= Pachyanthidium =

Genus of bees

Pachyanthidium is a genus of bees belonging to the family Megachilidae. The species of this genus are found in Africa and Southern Asia.

== Species ==
- Pachyanthidium anoplos Eardley & Griswold 2017
- Pachyanthidium arnoldi Mavromoustakis, 1935
- Pachyanthidium ausense (Mavromoustakis, 1934)
- Pachyanthidium benguelense (Vachal, 1903)
- Pachyanthidium bicolor (Lepeletier, 1841)
- Pachyanthidium bouyssoui (Vachal, 1903)
- Pachyanthidium cordatum (Smith, 1854)
- Pachyanthidium cucullatum (Friese, 1904)
- Pachyanthidium himalayense (Gupta & Sharma, 1993)
- Pachyanthidium katangense Cockerell, 1930
- Pachyanthidium lachrymosum (Smith, 1879)
- Pachyanthidium micheneri Pasteels, 1968
- Pachyanthidium nigrum Pasteels, 1984
- Pachyanthidium obscurum Pasteels, 1984
- Pachyanthidium paulinierii (Guérin-Méneville, 1845)
- Pachyanthidium rufescens (Friese, 1915)
- Pachyanthidium salamense (Friese, 1915)
- Pachyanthidium semiluteum Pasteels, 1981
