= Anthodioctes =

Scientific classification
- Domain: Eukaryota
- Kingdom: Animalia
- Phylum: Arthropoda
- Class: Insecta
- Order: Hymenoptera
- Family: Megachilidae
- Genus: Anthodioctes; Holmberg, 1903

Genus of bee

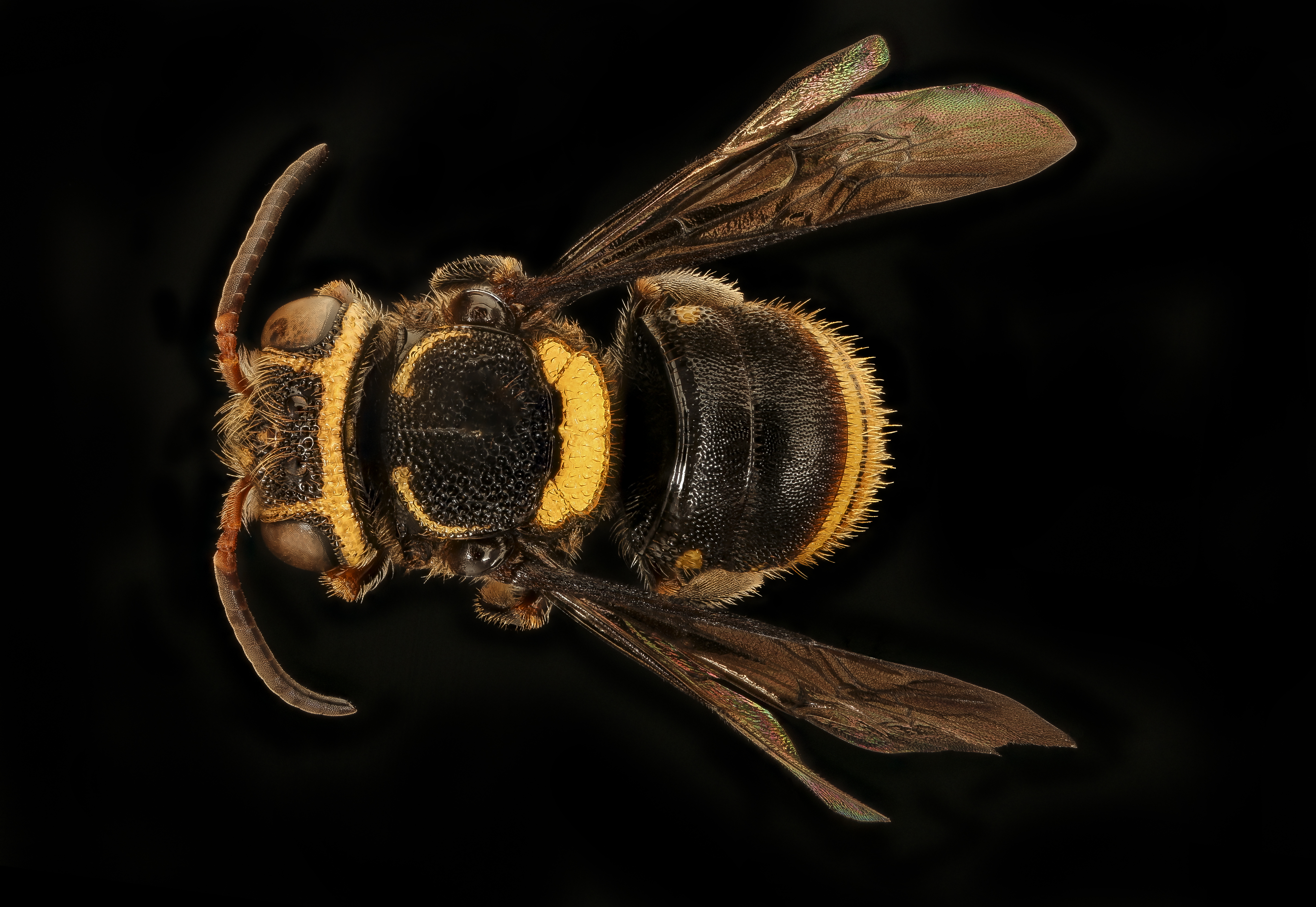
Anthodioctes calcaratus

Anthodioctes is a genus of bee in the family Megachilidae.

== Species ==
The following species are accepted within Anthodioctes:

- Anthodioctes affinis Urban, 2003
- Anthodioctes agnatus (Cresson, 1878)
- Anthodioctes analuizae (Urban, 1998)
- Anthodioctes angelicae Urban, 1999
- Anthodioctes argentinus Urban, 1999
- Anthodioctes ayalai Urban, 2002
- Anthodioctes banksi (Cockerell, 1928)
- Anthodioctes bettyae (Moure, 1947)
- Anthodioctes calcaratus (Friese, 1921)
- Anthodioctes callorhinus (Cockerell, 1927)
- Anthodioctes camargoi Urban, 1999
- Anthodioctes cerradicola Urban, 1999
- Anthodioctes chiribogae Urban, 1999
- Anthodioctes chrysurus (Cockerell, 1927)
- Anthodioctes claudii Urban, 1999
- Anthodioctes costaricensis Urban, 1999
- Anthodioctes fasciatus (Urban, 2007)
- Anthodioctes flavoalveolatus (Urban, 2007)
- Anthodioctes foersteri (Urban, 1998)
- Anthodioctes gracilis Urban, 1999
- Anthodioctes gualanensis (Cockerell, 1912)
- Anthodioctes guiomardi Urban, 2003
- Anthodioctes holmbergi (Cockerell, 1927)
- Anthodioctes indescriptus (Dalla Torre, 1890)
- Anthodioctes langei Urban, 1999
- Anthodioctes lauroi (Moure, 1947)
- Anthodioctes lourdes Urban, 1999
- Anthodioctes lunatus (Smith, 1854)
- Anthodioctes manauara Urban, 1999
- Anthodioctes manni (Cockerell, 1927)
- Anthodioctes mapirensis (Cockerell, 1927)
- Anthodioctes megachiloides Holmberg, 1903
- Anthodioctes meridionalis Urban, 1999
- Anthodioctes misiutae Urban, 2002
- Anthodioctes moratoi Urban, 1999
- Anthodioctes navarroi Urban, 1999
- Anthodioctes nitidipes (Cockerell, 1927)
- Anthodioctes panamensis (Urban, 1998)
- Anthodioctes peruvianus (Urban, 2007)
- Anthodioctes psaenythioides Holmberg, 1903
- Anthodioctes quadrimaculatus (Cockerell, 1927)
- Anthodioctes radialis (Ducke, 1908)
- Anthodioctes rosanae Urban, 2002
- Anthodioctes salti (Schwarz, 1933)
- Anthodioctes salvatoris Urban, 1999
- Anthodioctes sanmartinensis Urban, 2004
- Anthodioctes santosi Urban, 1999
- Anthodioctes schlindweini (Urban, 2007)
- Anthodioctes shilcayensis Urban, 2004
- Anthodioctes sioneii Urban, 1999
- Anthodioctes speciosus Urban, 1999
- Anthodioctes undecimalis (Cockerell, 1927)
- Anthodioctes vernoniae (Schrottky, 1911)
- Anthodioctes vilhenae Urban, 1999
- Anthodioctes willineri (Moure, 1947)
- Anthodioctes xilitlae Urban, 1999
- Anthodioctes zebratus (Schrottky, 1908)
