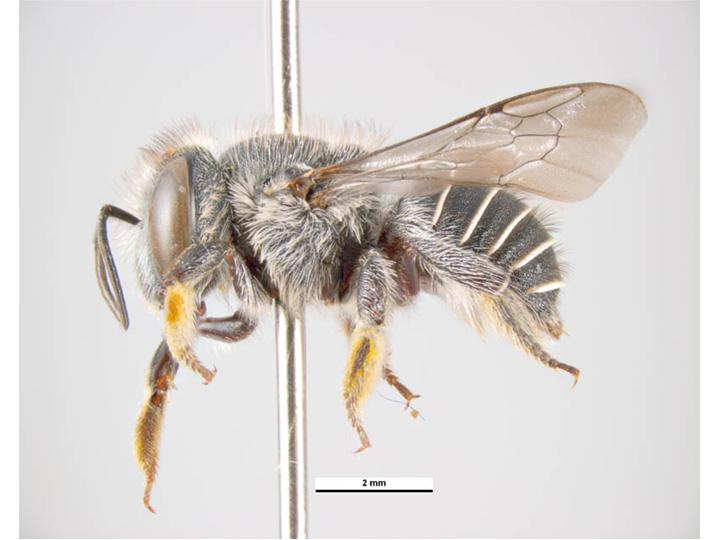
- Afranthidium repetitum

Scientific classification
- Domain: Eukaryota
- Kingdom: Animalia
- Phylum: Arthropoda
- Class: Insecta
- Order: Hymenoptera
- Family: Megachilidae
- Genus: Afranthidium; Michener, 1948

= Afranthidium =

Genus of bees

Afranthidium is a genus of bees belonging to the family Megachilidae. The species of this genus are found in Southern Asia, Africa and Australia.

== Species ==
- Afranthidium abdominale (Friese, 1904)
- Afranthidium ablusum (Cockerell, 1932)
- Afranthidium alaemon (Warncke, 1982)
- Afranthidium alternans (Klug, 1832)
- Afranthidium angulatellum (Pasteels, 1984)
- Afranthidium angulatum (Pasteels, 1984)
- Afranthidium biangulatum Pasteels, 1984
- Afranthidium biserratum (Pasteels, 1984)
- Afranthidium bispinosum Pasteels, 1984
- Afranthidium capicola (Brauns, 1905)
- Afranthidium carduele (Morawitz, 1876)
- Afranthidium concolor (Friese, 1913)
- Afranthidium controversum (Radoszkowski, 1886)
- Afranthidium folliculosum (Buysson, 1897)
- Afranthidium hamaticauda Pasteels, 1984
- Afranthidium herbsti (Pasteels, 1984)
- Afranthidium hoplogastrum (Mavromoustakis, 1934)
- Afranthidium hypocapicola (Mavromoustakis, 1936)
- Afranthidium karrooense (Brauns, 1905)
- Afranthidium lebanense (Mavromoustakis, 1955)
- Afranthidium malacopygum (Gribodo, 1894)
- Afranthidium melanopoda (Pasteels, 1984)
- Afranthidium murinum (Pasteels, 1984)
- Afranthidium nigritarse (Friese, 1904)
- Afranthidium odonturum (Cockerell, 1932)
- Afranthidium pentagonum (Gussakovsky, 1930)
- Afranthidium poecilodontum (Mavromoustakis, 1934)
- Afranthidium polyacanthum (Mavromoustakis, 1938)
- Afranthidium pusillum (Morawitz, 1895)
- Afranthidium reicherti (Brauns, 1929)
- Afranthidium rubellulum (Cockerell, 1932)
- Afranthidium rubellum (Brauns, 1905)
- Afranthidium schulthessii (Friese, 1897)
- Afranthidium silverlocki (Mavromoustakis, 1936)
- Afranthidium tergoangulatum Pasteels, 1984
- Afranthidium villosomarginatum Pasteels, 1984
