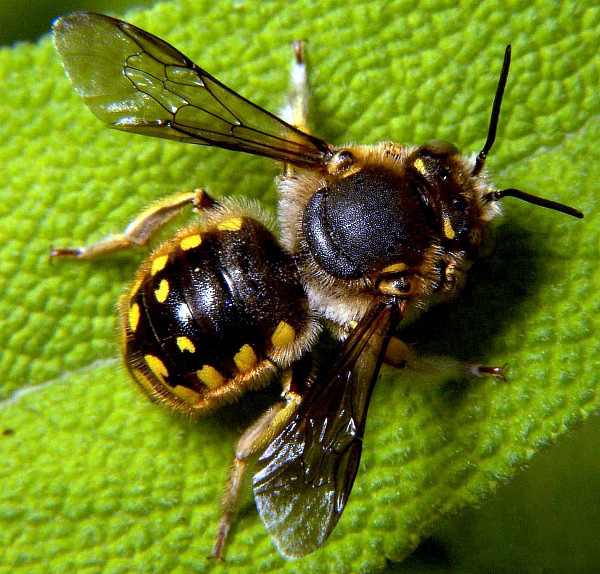
- Male European wool carder bee, Anthidium manicatum

Scientific classification
- Kingdom: Animalia
- Phylum: Arthropoda
- Clade: Pancrustacea
- Class: Insecta
- Order: Hymenoptera
- Infraorder: Aculeata
- Superfamily: Apoidea
- Clade: Anthophila
- Family: Megachilidae

Subfamilies
- Fideliinae; Lithurginae; Parharhophitinae; Megachilinae

= Megachilidae =

Megachilidae Temporal range: Middle Eocene – recent, 45–0 Ma

Cosmopolitan family of bees

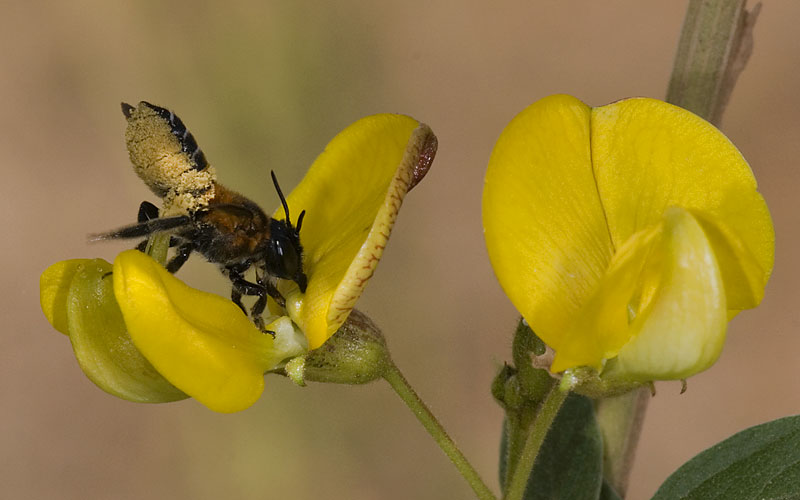
A leaf-cutter bee showing abdominal scopa

Megachilidae is a cosmopolitan family of mostly solitary bees. Characteristic traits of this family include the restriction of the pollen-carrying scopa to the entire ventral surface of the abdomen (rather than primarily on the hind legs as in most other bee families) and their typically elongated labra. Megachilid genera are most commonly known as mason bees and leafcutter bees, reflecting the materials from which they build their nest cells (soil or leaves, respectively); a few collect plant or animal hairs and fibers, and are called carder bees, while others use plant resins in nest construction and are correspondingly called resin bees. All species feed on nectar and pollen, but a few are kleptoparasites (informally called "cuckoo bees"), feeding on pollen collected by other megachilid bees. Parasitic species do not possess scopae. A megachilid bee collects pollen by rapidly tapping its abdomen against the floral reproductive structures, packing the pollen into its scope.

== Lifecycle ==
=== Nonparasites ===
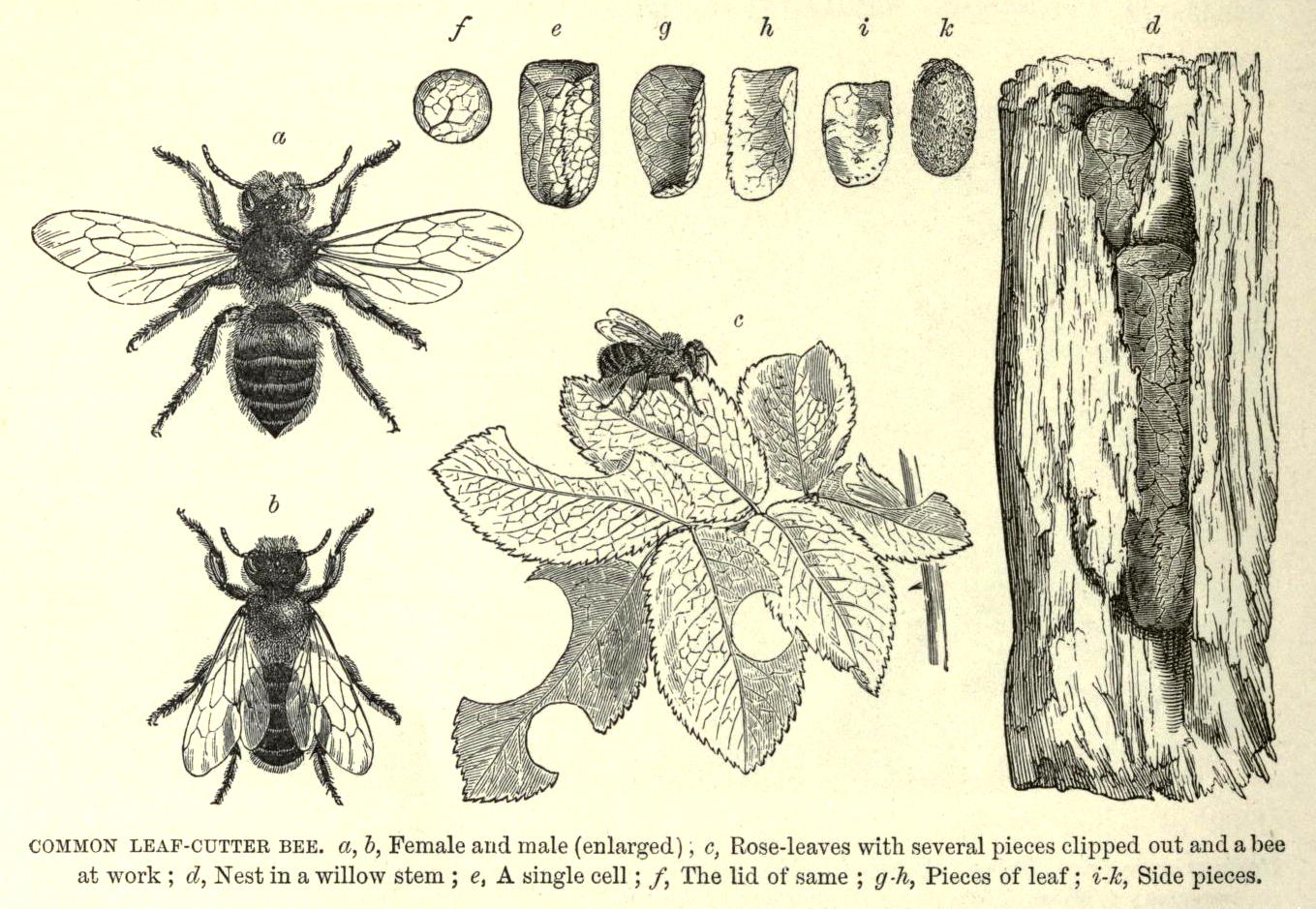
Life cycle

Nonparasitic Megachilidae typically divide their nests into cells. Each cell receives a supply of food (pollen or a pollen/nectar mix) and an egg; after finding a suitable spot (often near where she emerged), a female starts building a first cell, stocks it, and oviposits. She builds a wall that separates the completed cell from the next one. The larva hatches from the egg and consumes the food supply. After moulting a few times, it spins a cocoon and pupates. It emerges from the nest as an adult. Males die shortly after mating, but females survive for another few weeks, during which they build new nests.

Nests are often built in natural or artificial cavities. Some embed individual cells in a mass of clay or resin attached to a wall, rock surface, or plant stem. Nest cavities are often linear, for example in hollow plant stems (snail shells are used by some Osmia, and some species readily use irregular cavities).

Pollen collection by tapping has been observed only in the Megachilidae. Only the females possess an abdominal scope, which they use to gather pollen by holding the abdomen horizontally over the anthers, repeatedly lifting and lowering it against the pollen source, packing the dry pollen between the dense bristles of the scope. Their legs may assist in packing the pollen. During this time the female may also collect nectar, storing it in their crop.

Female Megachilidae collecting pollen by tapping on Coreopsis disc florets..

=== Parasites ===
Some genera of megachilids are brood parasites, so have no ventral scopa (e.g. Stelis and Coelioxys). They often parasitize related taxa. They typically enter the nest before it is sealed and lay their eggs in a cell. After hatching, the parasite larva kills the host larva, unless the female parasite has already done so, and then consumes the provisions. Parasitic species are of equal size or smaller than their victims. In 1921, the journal American Museum Novitates published a preliminary report on parasitic megachilid bees of the western United States.

== Diversity ==
North America has an estimated 630 different megachilid species, including Megachile, Anthidium, Hoplitis, and Osmia. Most Megachilidae are native, and a few are introduced, accidentally and intentionally; globally the number of species identified exceeds 4,000. Thus, the Megachilidae represent 15 to 20% of named species of bees.

The scientific name Megachilidae refers to the genus Megachile, translating roughly as "large-lipped" (Ancient Greek μέγᾰς (mégas, "big") + χεῖλος (kheîlos, "lip"); their "large lips" and strong jaws are well-suited for collection of nest-building materials.

Most Megachilidae build their nests in above-ground cavities; they all are solitary bees. Their nesting habits mean that in some studies of bee diversity, this bee family is most likely to be the one encountered, though the many ground-nesting bees are much greater in species numbers (about 70% of all bee species are ground nesters). For example, in Krombein's trap-nesting survey (1967), almost all bees that nested in his offerings were megachilid species — 40 of 43 occupying bee species. (They were outnumbered in diversity by almost twice as many species of wasps (75) that used the nests).

Because they are (mostly) above-ground nesters and more commonly attracted to artificial nests, megachilid bees are also more commonly cultivated than ground-nesting solitary bees. They accept nesting materials made from hollow stems, tubes, and blocks with preformed holes ("nest blocks"), and several megachilids have become important species for agricultural / horticultural pollination. In North America, these cultivated bees include the introduced Megachile rotundata, (alfalfa leafcutter bees), used extensively in alfalfa pollination, and the western native and frequently raised Osmia lignaria (the orchard mason bee or blue orchard bee), used in orchard pollination. Other Osmia and Megachile species are also in commercial use in North America, Europe, and Asia.

A suite of megachilids rely on plant resins for nest construction. These "resin bees" are typically smaller than honeybees and are effective pollinators, although the hard, glue-like resins can complicate management of other tunnel-nesting bees. Carder bees, Anthidium, are unique for using plant fibers; 80 to 90 species of them are in North America. Ironically, a non-native, the best known A. manicatum, the European wool carder bee, was accidentally introduced to the Americas in the late '60s and has now spread across the continent. It has been described as "... perhaps the most widely distributed unmanaged bee species in the world." Like most Anthidium, rather than cutting leaves or petals, A. manicatum scrapes the hairs from leaves to use for nesting material. It is atypical because the male is larger than the female and constantly on patrol, protecting a "harem" by chasing and even attacking all interlopers, including honeybees and bumblebees, its tail equipped with multiple prongs that can knife in between the segments of almost any intruder.

Neither the introduced Anthidium nor its American relatives are considered parasites, only territorial and at times aggressive, though some genera are so, including Coelioxys (kleptoparasites mostly of leafcutter bees) and Stelis (kleptoparasites of leafcutter and mason bees).

While some Megachilidae are extensively studied for their commercial possibilities (or impacts), others are studied by naturalists. Mason bees, not commonly cultivated, are known through extended observation and writings in the last half of the 19th century by Jean-Henri Fabre, with his writings made further famous by his English translator Alexander Teixeira de Mattos ("The Mason Bee"); Fabre wrote many observations, including of other Megachilidae, from his home in France, and his writings inspired many future researchers and enthusiasts, from Charles Darwin to Gerald Durrell.

Leaf cutter bee nesting

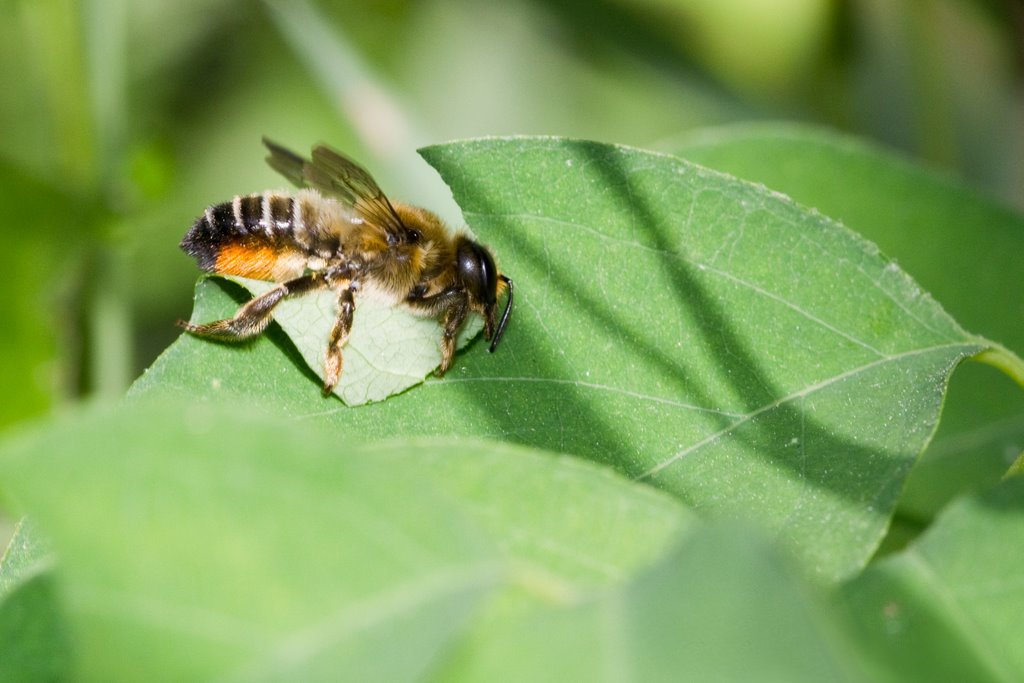
Megachile centuncularis cutting a leaf

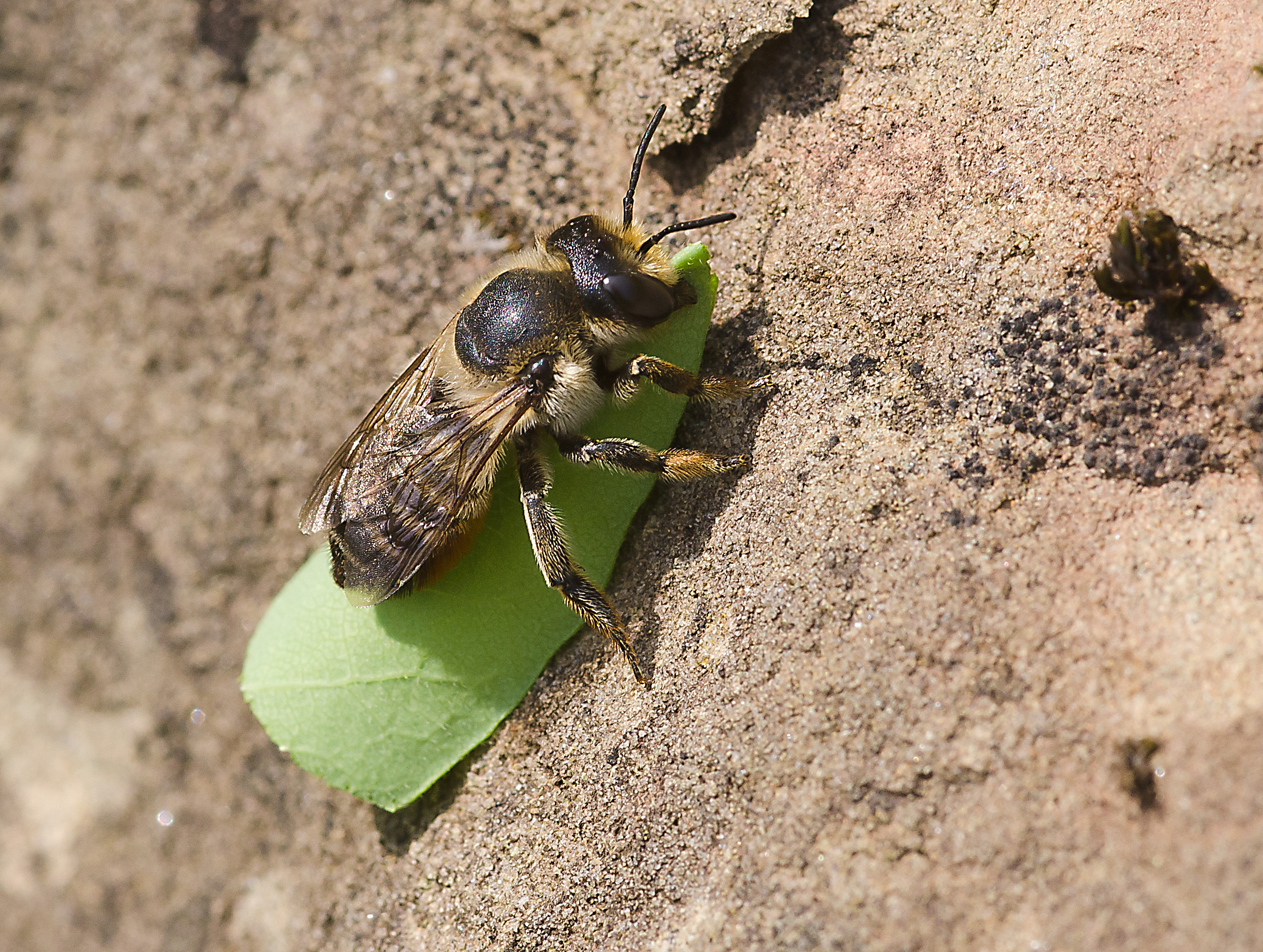
Megachile sp. with cut leaf

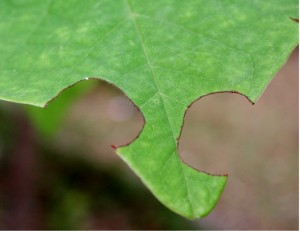
Leaves cut by Megachile sp.

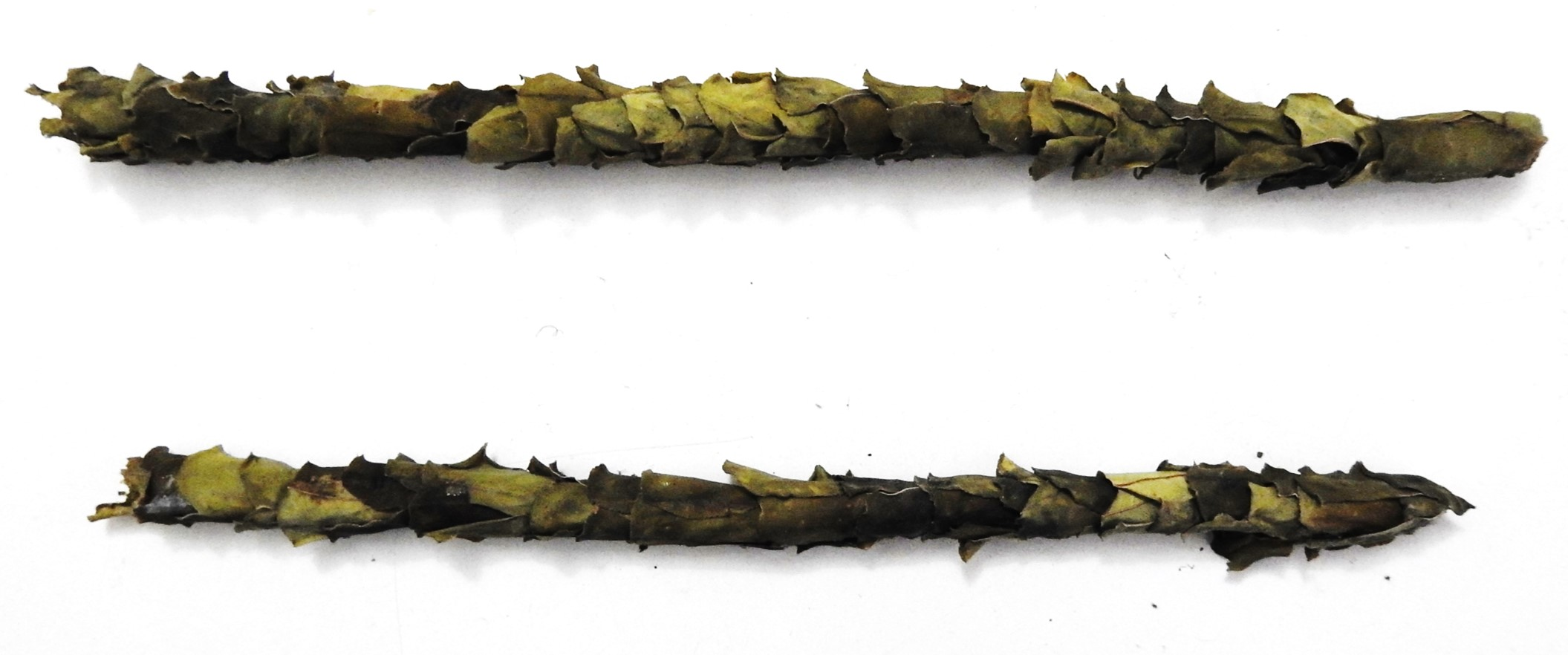
Nests of Megachile from Bangalore, India.

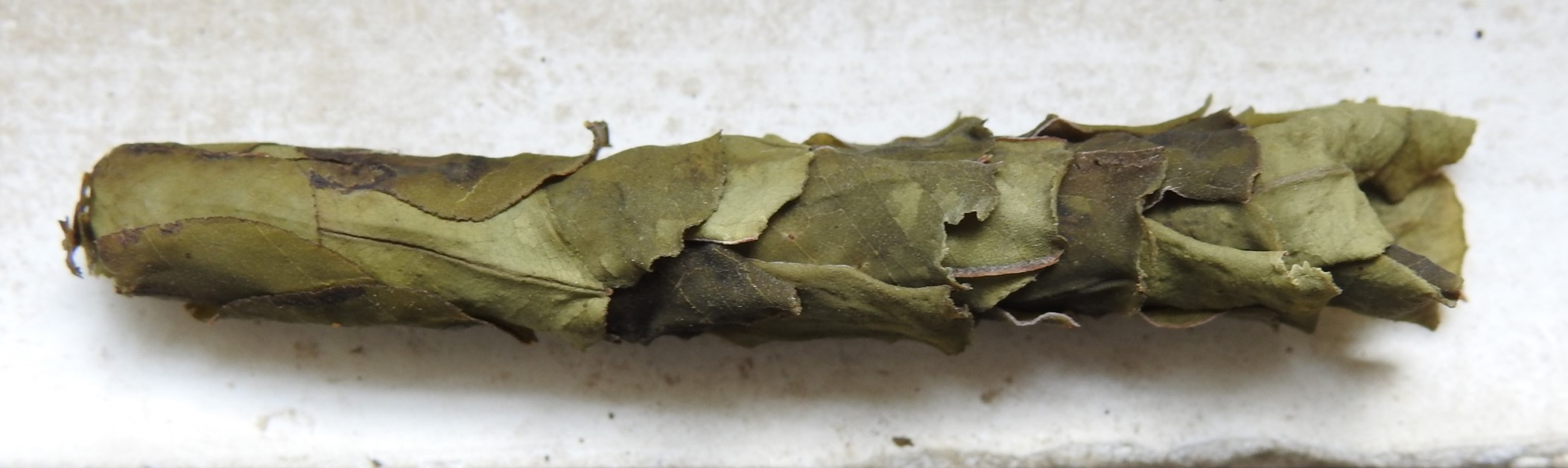
Dissected nest of a Megachile

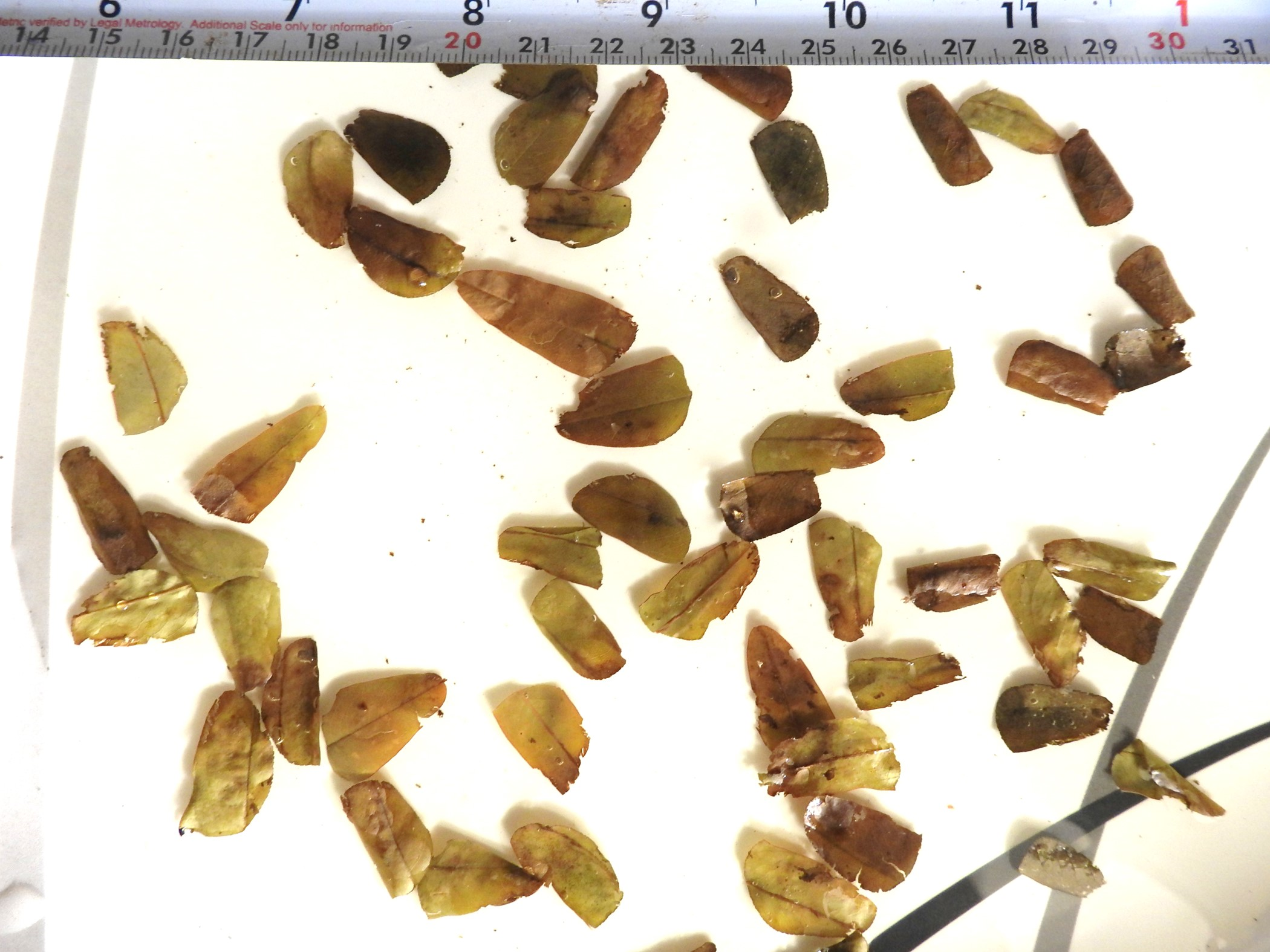
Dissected cut leaf bits from a nest.
photo/video gallery

Male Megachile, a leaf-cutting bee, making hovering approach to a female Megachile resting on a common sunflower. Portions repeated at one-tenth speed.

Male Megachile, leaf-cutting bees, discouraging honeybees from visiting their common sunflower perch and nectar source. Portions repeated at one-tenth and one twenty-fifth speed.

Female leafcutter bee nectaring on Great Valley gumplant. The three scenes repeated at one tenth speed.

== Evolution and taxonomy ==
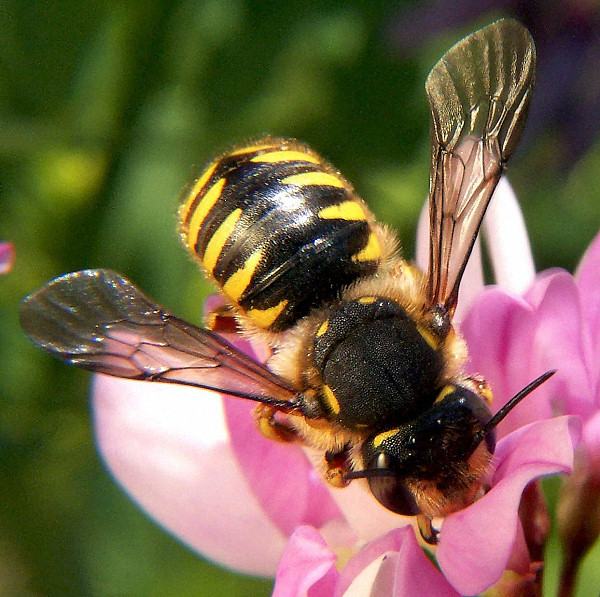
Carder bee (Anthidium manicatum), female

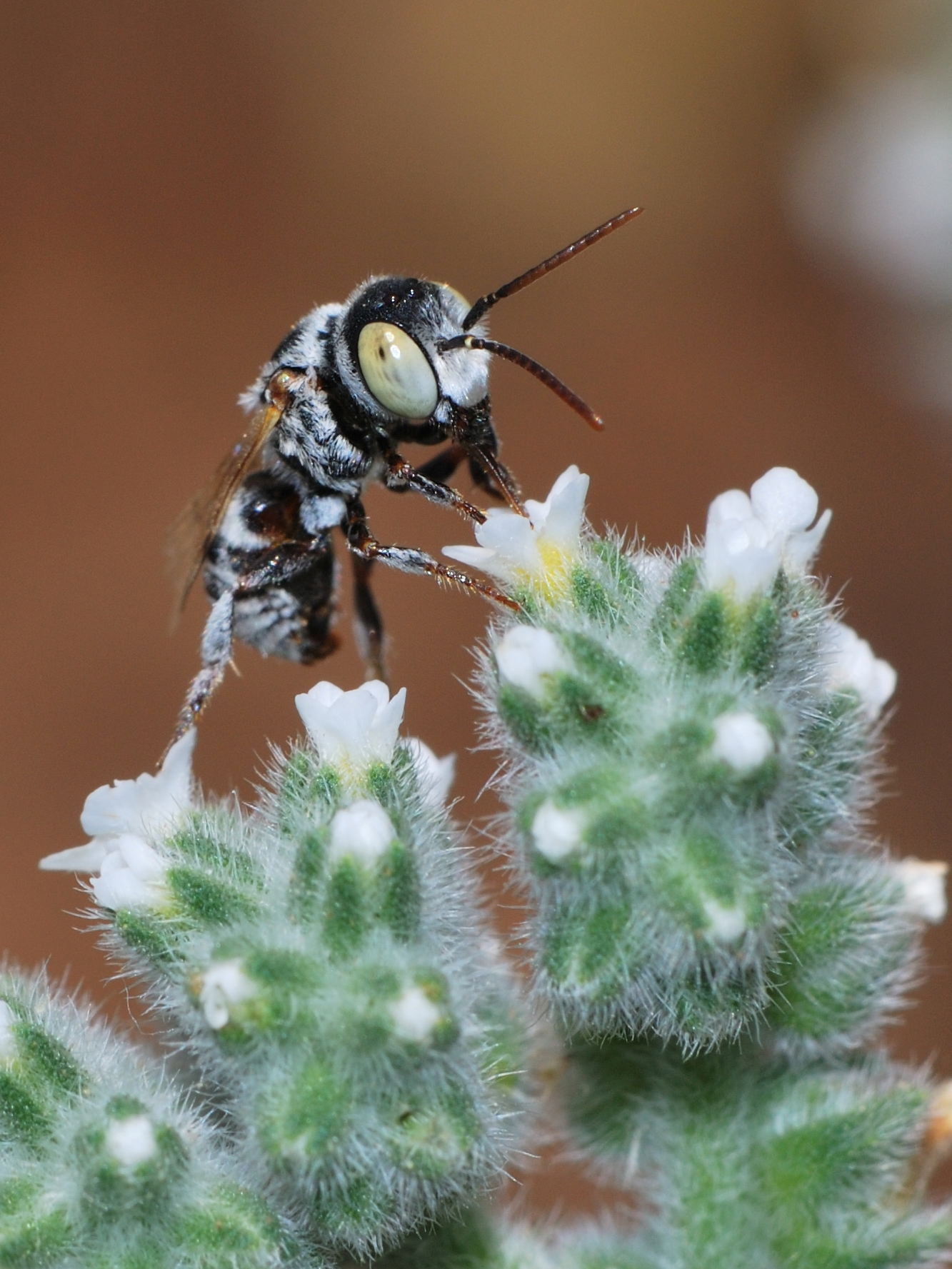
Male Haetosmia vechti, foraging on Heliotropium in Mevo Horon, West Bank

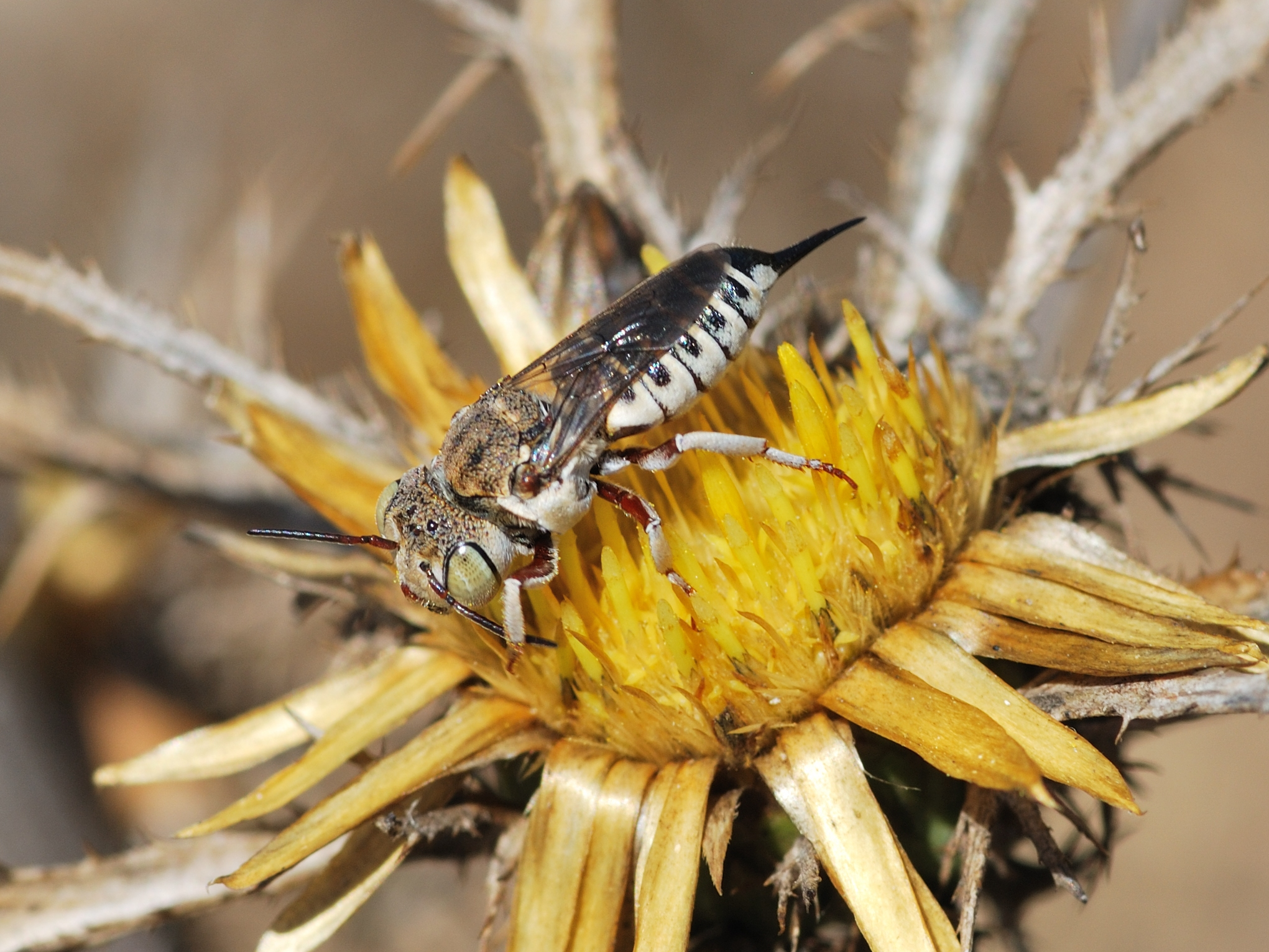
Coelioxys acanthura, female

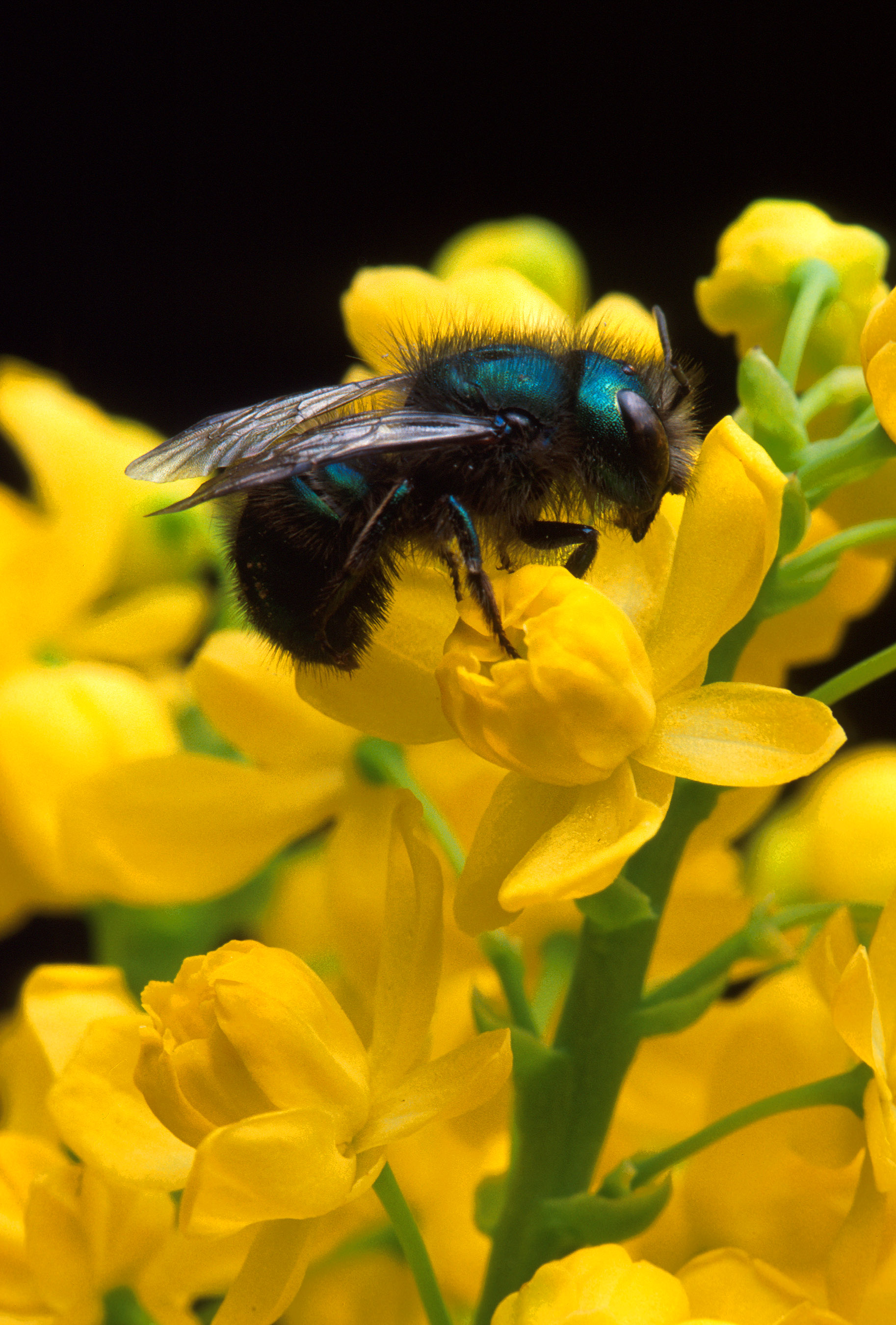
Osmia ribifloris

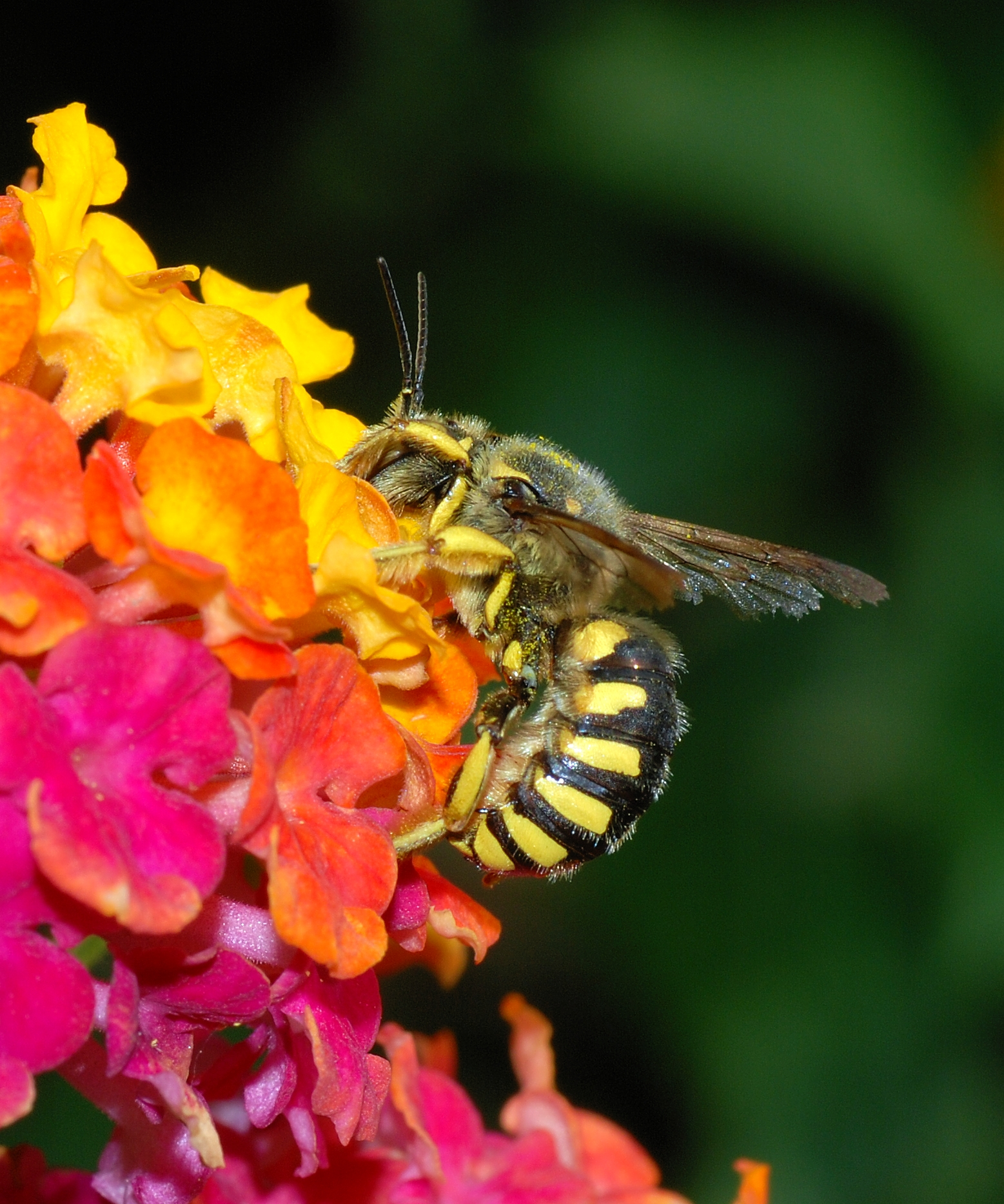
Male Anthidium florentinum visiting Lantana

The fossil record for megachilid bees is poor, but a Middle Eocene dicotyledonous leaf shows definite semicircular cutouts along its margin, implying that leaf-cutting bees existed at that time. Multiply-cut leaves and rare body fossils from the Eocene of Germany and the Paleocene of France suggest that Megachilinae began cutting leaves early in their evolution. Phylogenetic analysis yields an age consistent with this Eocene origin for the group.

- Subfamily Fideliinae
  - Tribe Pararhophitini
    - Pararhophites
  - Tribe Fideliini
    - Fidelia
    - Neofidelia
- Subfamily Lithurginae
  - Tribe Lithurgini
    - Lithurgopsis
    - Lithurgus
    - Microthurge
    - Trichothurgus
  - Tribe † Protolithurgiini
    - †Protolithurgus
- Subfamily Megachilinae
  - Tribe Osmiini
    - Afroheriades
    - Ashmeadiella
    - Atoposmia
    - Bekilia
    - Chelostoma
    - Haetosmia
    - Heriades species have narrow abdominal bands. They resemble small Osmia, but they are oligolectic (specialized on a few subfamilies of Asteraceae) and use resin from conifers, as well as plant fibers and sand, as cell wall material.
    - Hofferia
    - Hoplitis
    - Hoplosmia
    - Noteriades
    - Ochreriades
    - Osmia
    - Othinosmia
    - Protosmia
    - Pseudoheriades
    - Stenoheriades
    - Stenosmia
    - Wainia
    - Xeroheriades
  - Tribe Anthidiini
    - Acedanthidium
    - Afranthidium
    - Afrostelis
    - Anthidiellum
    - Anthidioma
    - Anthidium
    - Anthodioctes
    - Apianthidium
    - Aspidosmia
    - Austrostelis
    - Aztecanthidium
    - Bathanthidium
    - Benanthis
    - Cyphanthidium
    - Dianthidium
    - Duckeanthidium
    - Eoanthidium
    - Epanthidium
    - Euaspis
    - Hoplostelis
    - Hypanthidioides
    - Hypanthidium
    - Icteranthidium
    - Indanthidium
    - Larinostelis
    - Notanthidium
    - Pachyanthidium
    - Paranthidium
    - Plesianthidium
    - Pseudoanthidium
    - Rhodanthidium
    - Serapista
    - Stelis Panzer and related genera (stelidine bees) are kleptoparasites on other Megachilidae. They belong to the tribe Anthidiini. Bees in the subgenus Heterostelis are parasitic on Trachusa.
    - Trachusa
    - Trachusoides
    - Xenostelis
  - Tribe Dioxyini
    - Aglaoapis
    - Allodioxys
    - Dioxys is a brood parasite of Megachile, Anthidium, and Osmia.
    - Ensliniana
    - Eudioxys
    - Metadioxys
    - Paradioxys
    - Prodioxys
  - Tribe Megachilini
    - Coelioxys is a brood parasite of Megachile. Females have a pointed conic abdominal apex (tip); males have several spikes on their apices.
    - Megachile
    - Radoszkowskiana
  - incertae sedis
    - Neochalicodoma
    - Stellenigris
