= Chelostomoides =

Scientific classification
- Kingdom: Animalia
- Phylum: Arthropoda
- Clade: Pancrustacea
- Class: Insecta
- Order: Hymenoptera
- Family: Megachilidae
- Genus: Megachile
- Subgenus: Chelostomoides; Robertson, 1901

Subgenus of leafcutter bees (Megachile)

Chelostomoides is a subgenus of bees in the genus Megachile (leaf-cutter and resin bees). These bees do not cut leaves, but use resin, mud, or other materials.

== Species ==
Species:

- Megachile abacula
- Megachile adelphodonta
- Megachile alucaba
- Megachile angelarum
- Megachile armaticeps
- Megachile asymmetrica
- Megachile axyx
- Megachile bipartita
- Megachile browni
- Megachile campanulae
- Megachile cartagenensis
- Megachile chilopsidis
- Megachile davidsoni
- Megachile discorhina
- Megachile ecplectica
- Megachile exilis
- Megachile georgica
- Megachile haematoxylonae
- Megachile izucara
- Megachile jamaicae
- Megachile lobatifrons
- Megachile manni
- Megachile occidentalis
- Megachile odontostoma
- Megachile otomita
- Megachile peruviana
- Megachile prosopidis
- Megachile quadridentata
- Megachile rawi
- Megachile reflexa
- Megachile rugifrons
- Megachile spinotulata
- Megachile subexilis
- Megachile texensis
