= List of Stelis (bee) species =

List of species in the genus Stelis

This is a list of 106 species in the genus Stelis.

== Stelis species ==
- Stelis aculeata Morawitz, 1880
- Stelis acutiventris Linsley, 1939
- Stelis aegyptiaca Radoszkowski, 1876
- Stelis annulata (Lepeletier, 1841)
- Stelis anthidioides Timberlake, 1941
- Stelis anthracina Timberlake, 1941
- Stelis ashmeadiellae Timberlake, 1941
- Stelis ater Mitchell, 1962
- Stelis australis Cresson, 1878
- Stelis bengala Warncke, 1992
- Stelis breviuscula (Nylander, 1848)
- Stelis calliphorina (Cockerell, 1911)
- Stelis callura Cockerell, 1925
- Stelis carnifex Cockerell, 1911
- Stelis chlorocyanea (Cockerell, 1925)
- Stelis coarctata Crawford, 1916
- Stelis cockerelli (Hicks, 1933)
- Stelis costalis Cresson, 1872
- Stelis costaricensis Friese, 1921
- Stelis crassiceps Cockerell, 1926
- Stelis cusackae (Cockerell, 1910)
- Stelis denticulata Friese, 1899
- Stelis depressa Timberlake, 1941
- Stelis diversicolor Crawford, 1916
- Stelis elegans Cresson, 1864
- Stelis elongativentris Parker, 1987
- Stelis foederalis Smith, 1854
- Stelis fragariella (Cockerell, 1925)
- Stelis franciscana (Cockerell, 1925)
- Stelis franconica Blüthgen, 1930
- Stelis fremonti Cockerell, 1925
- Stelis gigantea Friese, 1921
- Stelis grossa (Mitchell, 1962)
- Stelis hemirhoda Linsley, 1939
- Stelis herberti (Cockerell, 1916)
- Stelis holocyanea (Cockerell, 1925)
- Stelis hungarica Noskiewicz, 1962
- Stelis hurdi (Thorp, 1966)
- Stelis idahoensis Swenk, 1914
- Stelis interrupta Cresson, 1897
- Stelis iugae Noskiewicz, 1962
- Stelis labiata (Provancher, 1888)
- Stelis lateralis Cresson, 1864
- Stelis laticincta Cresson, 1878
- Stelis laverna Baker, 1999
- Stelis leucotricha (Cockerell, 1925)
- Stelis linsleyi Timberlake, 1941
- Stelis louisae Cockerell, 1911
- Stelis maculata (Provancher, 1888)
- Stelis malaccensis (Friese, 1914)
- Stelis manni Crawford, 1917
- Stelis maroccana Warncke, 1992
- Stelis melanotricha (Cockerell, 1925)
- Stelis melanura Cockerell, 1924
- Stelis micheneri Linsley, 1939
- Stelis michiganensis Mitchell, 1962
- Stelis minima Schenck, 1861
- Stelis minuta Lepeletier & Audinet-Serville, 1825
- Stelis modesta Alfken, 1931
- Stelis montana Cresson, 1864
- Stelis monticola Cresson, 1878
- Stelis nasuta (Latreille, 1809)
- Stelis nigrita (Fabricius, 1775)
- Stelis nigriventris Timberlake, 1941
- Stelis nitida Cresson, 1878
- Stelis nitidula (Cockerell, 1925)
- Stelis nyssonoides (Brues, 1903)
- Stelis odontopyga Noskiewicz, 1926
- Stelis oreophila Popov, 1935
- Stelis orientalis Warncke, 1992
- Stelis ornatula (Klug, 1807)
- Stelis palmarum Timberlake, 1941
- Stelis pardita (Parker & Griswold, 1993)
- Stelis pavonina (Cockerell, 1908)
- Stelis pentelica Mavromoustakis, 1963
- Stelis permaculata Cockerell, 1898
- Stelis perpulchra Crawford, 1916
- Stelis phaeoptera (Kirby, 1802)
- Stelis plena (Provancher, 1888)
- Stelis pulchra Crawford, 1902
- Stelis punctulatissima (Kirby, 1802)
- Stelis rhodia Mavromoustakis, 1960
- Stelis ricardonis (Cockerell, 1912)
- Stelis robertsoni Timberlake, 1941
- Stelis rozeni Griswold & Parker, 2003
- Stelis rubi Cockerell, 1898
- Stelis rudbeckiarum Cockerell, 1904
- Stelis ruficornis Morawitz, 1872
- Stelis saxicola Warncke, 1992
- Stelis scutellaris Morawitz, 1894
- Stelis semenovi Popov, 1933
- Stelis semirubra Timberlake, 1941
- Stelis seneciophila Cockerell, 1908
- Stelis sexmaculata Ashmead, 1896
- Stelis siamensis Friese, 1925
- Stelis signata (Latreille, 1809)
- Stelis simillima Morawitz, 1876
- Stelis strandi Popov, 1935
- Stelis subcaerulea Cresson, 1878
- Stelis subemarginata Cresson, 1878
- Stelis subglauca (Cockerell, 1925)
- Stelis texana (Thorp, 1966)
- Stelis trichopyga Timberlake, 1941
- Stelis tuberculata Cockerell, 1919
- Stelis vernalis Mitchell, 1962
- Stelis verticalis Wu, 1992
