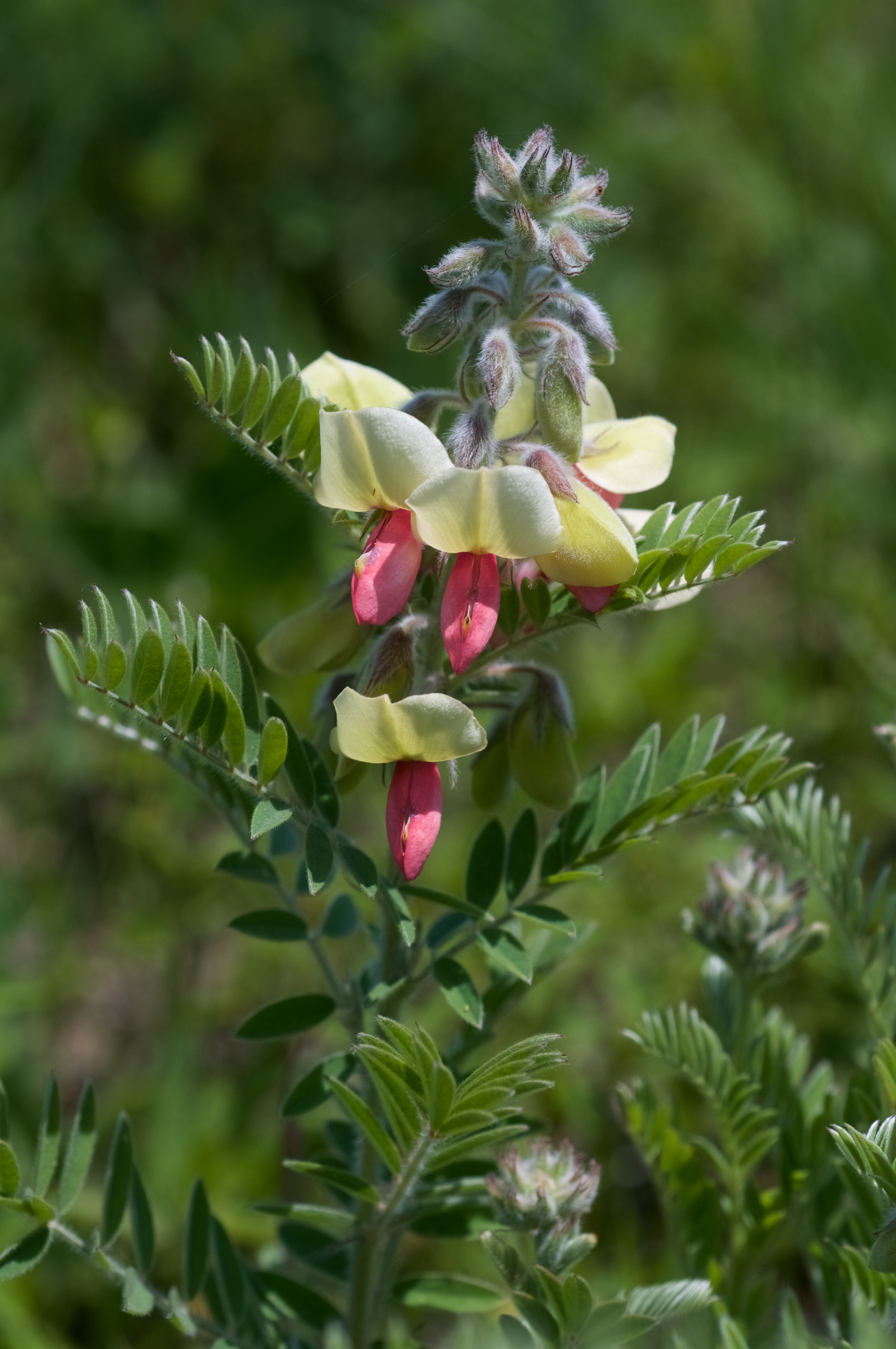

Conservation status
- Secure (NatureServe)

Scientific classification
- Kingdom: Plantae
- Clade: Tracheophytes
- Clade: Angiosperms
- Clade: Eudicots
- Clade: Rosids
- Order: Fabales
- Family: Fabaceae
- Subfamily: Faboideae
- Genus: Tephrosia
- Species: T. virginiana

Binomial name
- Tephrosia virginiana (L.) Pers.

Synonyms
- Cracca holosericea (Nutt.) Britten & Baker f.; Cracca latidens Small; Cracca leucosericea Rydb.; Cracca virginiana L.; Galega virginiana (L.) L.; Galega virginica (L.) J.F.Gmel.; Tephrosia holosericea Nutt.; Tephrosia latidens (Small) Standl.; Tephrosia leucosericea (Rydb.) Cory; Tephrosia virginica Bigelow

= Tephrosia virginiana =

Species of legume

Tephrosia virginiana, also known as goat-rue, goat's rue, catgut, rabbit pea, Virginia tephrosia, hoary pea, and devil's shoestring is a perennial dicot in family Fabaceae. The plant is native to central and eastern North America.

== Description ==
This subshrub is low and bushy, growing to 60 centimetres (2 ft), but more often shorter. Its leaves are alternate and compound, usually with 8 to 15 pairs of narrow, oblong leaflets. Soft white hairs on the leaves and the stem give them a silvery, or hoary, appearance.

The flowers look similar to other flowers in the pea family and are bi-colored, with a pale yellow or cream upper petal (the standard), and pink petals on the bottom (the keel and wings). The flowers are grouped into clusters at the top of the stems and bloom from May to August. The seed pods that form after the flowers bloom are small, approximately 5 centimetres (2 in) long.

The roots are long and stringy, which is probably the source of the common names catgut and devil's shoestrings.

== Distribution and habitat ==
This plant prefers acidic soils, in part to full sun. It grows throughout the Midwest, New England and southeastern United States. Not easy to propagate because of the relationship it has with the acid soil it needs, this plant can be found in sand savannas, open woods and glades, prairies and rocky soils.

== Toxicity ==
All tissues of this plant are toxic (containing rotenone), and should not be eaten by people or livestock. Crushed stems were previously used as a fish poison.

== Conservation ==
While ranked as secure rangewide by NatureServe, T. virginiana has been listed as an endangered species in Canada under Schedule 1 of the Species at Risk Act since 2003. Only two populations exist within black oak savanna and black oak woodland in Ontario.

== Historical uses ==
According to James Mooney, Cherokee Indian women used to wash their hair in a decoction made from its roots to prevent their hair from breaking or falling out.

== Ecology ==
Tephrosia virginiana is insect pollinated and is recorded to have been visited in northern Florida by Anthidiellum notatum, Anthidiellum perplexum,Augochloropsis metallica, Bombus impatiens, Halictus poeyi/ligatus, Lasioglossum floridanum Lasioglossum reticulatum, Megachile addenda, Megachile campanulae, Megachile exilis Megachile frugalis , Megachile georgica, Megachile mendica, Megachile petulans, Megachile pseudobrevis, Megachile texana, Sphecodes fattigi, and Xylocopa virginica .
