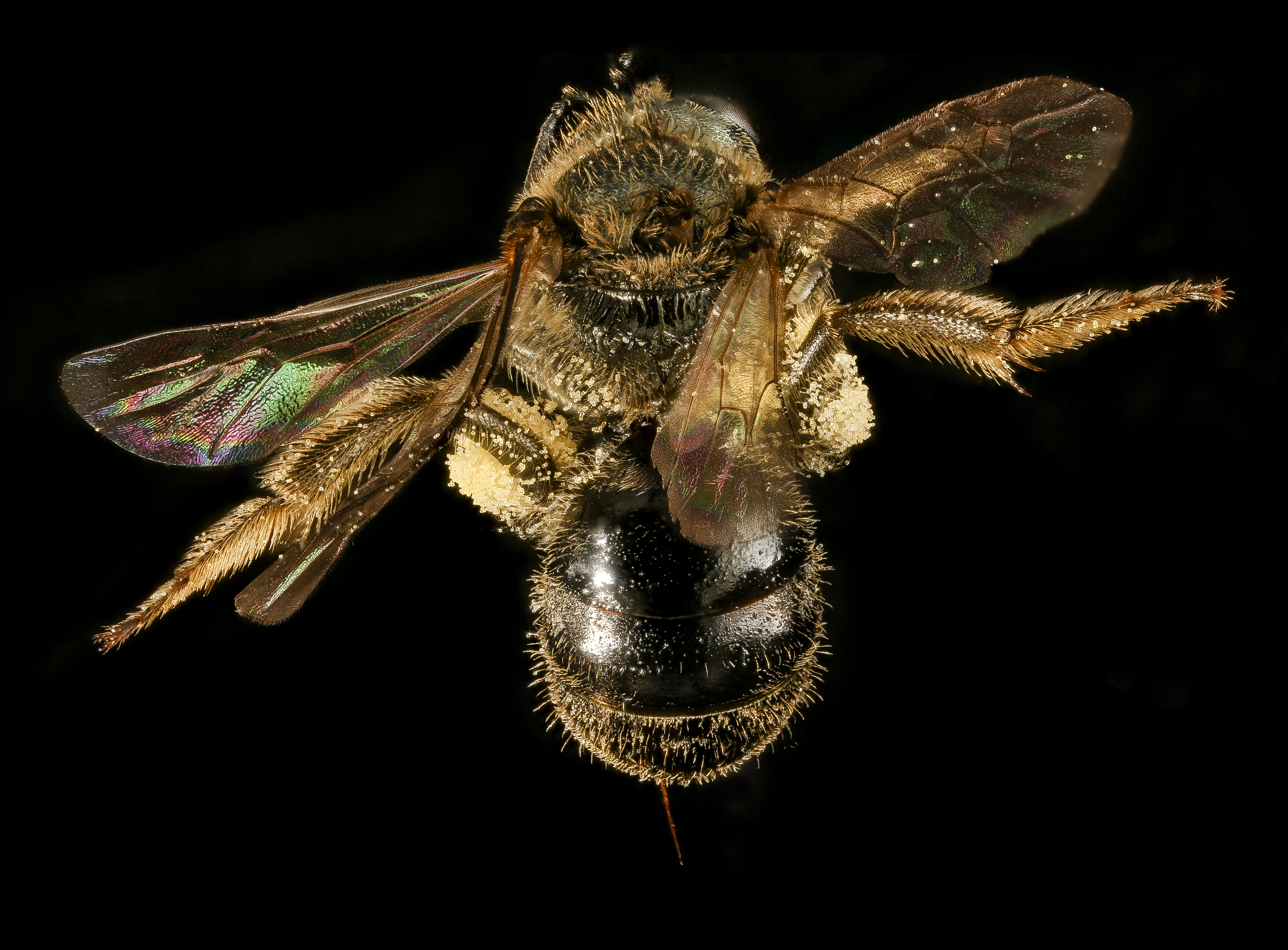
- Lasioglossum cressonii, female

Scientific classification
- Kingdom: Animalia
- Phylum: Arthropoda
- Clade: Pancrustacea
- Class: Insecta
- Order: Hymenoptera
- Family: Halictidae
- Genus: Lasioglossum
- Subgenus: Lasioglossum (Dialictus)
- Species: L. cressonii

Binomial name
- Lasioglossum cressonii Robertson, 1890

= Lasioglossum cressonii =

Species of insect

Lasioglossum cressonii (Robertson, 1890) is a species in the sweat bee genus Lasioglossum, family Halictidae. Halictidae exhibit eusocial hierarchy behavior which is interesting given that eusociality in this group is hard to evolve and easy to lose. L. cressonii is found throughout North America. L. cressonii have been shown to be important pollinators for apple trees and many other North American native plants.

== Taxonomy ==
L. cressonii is within the family Apoidea and subfamily Halictidae, commonly known as sweat bees. These bees are often very similar morphologically which makes studying their taxonomy difficult. The genus, Lasioglossum, is a more recent genus as evidenced by the fact that there are no known fossils. Lasioglossum is a socially diverse genus with a number of subcategories associated with it. Lasioglossum cressonii was first physically characterized by Charles Robertson in 1890.

== Description and identification ==
=== Females ===
The thorax and heads of female L. cressonii appear to be a brassy green color, but the area below the ocelli appears dull. They are also characterized by deep, distinctive, and coarse punctures on the face that get smaller as they move outwards from the center. The scutellum is medially rugoso-punctate and becomes more distinctly punctate on the sides. Its wings have a glassy appearance and its veins and stigma have a dull brick-red color. The abdomen and legs are glossy brownish black, and the abdomen is nearly impunctate. Females can be distinguished from others by the golden green color of their thorax and heads and their very coarse mesoscutal punctures that are relatively dense between parapsidal lines.

=== Males ===
The thorax and heads of male L. cressonii are dark olive green and look nearly blue in certain areas. The abdomen is black and the scutellum is slightly grooved in the middle where it is more punctate, but on the sides of the abdomen the punctures are more less dense. Male veins and stigma are also a dull brick-red color. The bottom portion of the legs are glossy brownish black while the upper portion is also a dull brick red. The abdomen is shiny and essentially impunctate. In order to distinguish males, one can look for clypeal hairs that do not obscure the surface and punctures on the anterior portion of the mesoscutum.

== Distribution and habitat ==
L. cressonii can be found in Nova Scotia west to British Columbia, from Washington south to Georgia and west to Colorado. These include the states of Maine, Massachusetts, Connecticut, Illinois, Maryland, Montana, and Washington. There have also been bees found and studied in apple orchards in New York. Nests are usually in soil or wood and eusocial bees like L. cressonii tend to be in low elevation areas.

== Colony cycle ==
L. cressoni is a eusocial species and bees of the family Apoidae tend to found nests in similar ways. Nests can be founded by an overwintering gyne which is a female bee who has sperm stored from her mating the previous year. In this "foundress phase," the female will construct a nest (usually in soil or wood). This can be done in a group as well. Females will rear more than one brood and the first one often has a sex ratio biased toward females. These females in the first brood will then become the workers or, in some species, mate immediately and enter diapause so they can be the overwintering gyne. Once the first brood has emerged, the colony enters the worker phase. In this phase, queens will stop foraging and stay in the nest. The workers put pollen and nectar into the cells of the nest where the queen can lay her eggs. This phase can last for one to three broods depending on the length of the season. Morphological difference between queens and workers is usually rather subtle and the groups share many characteristics. At the end of the worker phase a reproductive brood is produced which begins the reproductive phase. The females produced late in this reproductive brood will mate and then go into diapause for the next season. The reproductive brood usually has more males than females in contrast to the first brood which tends to have more females. While there is some variation, most Halictine bees begin with broods that are female heavy, but the size of the females is generally relatively small. The later broods, however, have more males who are larger in size. These changes are usually dependent on temperature and the length of day.

== Eusocial behavior ==
L. cressonii are part of a family of largely eusocial bees. This means that these bees have a queen who is responsible for behavior that helps to differentiate members of a colony.

=== Queens ===
Queens regulate the sex ratios of the broods depending on the time in the cycle; earlier in the cycle there is a female bias and later in the cycle there is a male bias in the sex ratio. In addition, the queen must manage the body sizes of her daughters as well. It is possible that this is done by allocating different amounts of pollen to the different broods. Generally, female worker bees are smaller than the foundress bees that come along in the reproductive broods later on. Queens also stop foraging once the first brood emerges.

=== Foundresses ===
L. cressonii are eusocial bees, meaning that not all of their attributes are social. Foundresses are bees who have stored sperm from the mating season and are destined to be queens of their own colony. They perform the tasks of founding nests, excavating burrows, constructing cells, protecting the nest, and foraging for pollen and nectar.

=== Worker bees ===
Worker bees are a part of the earlier broods brought forth by the queen. Their behavior as workers is influenced by the queen's behavior, and they are generally smaller than foundresses. They allocate pollen and nectar to the cells in the nest.

=== Dominance hierarchy ===
Eusocial bees have a queen, which are at the top of the hierarchy. The foundresses and worker bees can then be found beneath the queens within this hierarchy.

=== Mating ===
L. cressonii have reproductive broods after the initial worker broods. Within these reproductive broods there will be females who mate with males and then enter diapause. They will hold the sperm in their spermatheca until the next spring and will be able to act as overwintering gynes or reproductive females later on.

== Interaction with other species ==
=== Apple pollination ===
With the decline in honeybees there has been concern about how certain plants will continue to get pollinated. In a study of different bee species visiting apple orchards across New York, it was found that L. cressonii were among the bees who pollinated apples in apple orchards.

=== Diet ===
L. cressonii pollinate flowers and use their nectar and pollen for their broods. Lasioglossum cressoni has been observed pollinating the following species of flower: Apocynum, Azalea, Barbarea, Berteroa, Brassica, Chrysanthemum, Cirsium, Claytonia, Daucus, Evonymus, Fagopyrum, Geranium, Houstonia, Hydrangea, Illex, Melilotus, Pedicularis, Potentilla, Rubus, Salvia, Solidago, Taraxacum, Vagnera, Viburnum. Alisma, Amelanchier, Cacalia, Capsella, Chaerophyllum, Crataegus, Cryptotaenia, Hypoxis, Isopyrum, Ludwigia, Melilotus, Prunus, Ptelea, Ranunculus, Rhus, Ribes, Salix, Sassafras, Symphoricarpos, Virbascum, Viola, Zanthoxylum, Amorpha, Philadelphus, Pyrus malus, Rhododendron and Vacinium.

== Human importance ==
=== Effects of logging ===
The effects of tree clearing on bees has been found to be helpful as opposed to harmful. In areas where there was logging, there was an increase in the diversity of bees in that area, including L. cressonii. While human intervention can often be harmful for bees, in this case the clearing of trees allows for more sunlight and an increase in different types of flora which attracts a diverse group of bees native to the area because of these increased foraging and nesting sites.
