= Stelis interrupta =

Scientific classification
- Kingdom: Animalia
- Phylum: Arthropoda
- Clade: Pancrustacea
- Class: Insecta
- Order: Hymenoptera
- Family: Megachilidae
- Genus: Stelis
- Species: S. interrupta

Binomial name
- Stelis interrupta Cresson, 1897

Species of bee

Stelis interrupta is a species of cuckoo bee in the family Megachilidae. It is found in North America.
