= Stelis melanotricha =

Scientific classification
- Kingdom: Animalia
- Phylum: Arthropoda
- Class: Insecta
- Order: Hymenoptera
- Family: Megachilidae
- Genus: Stelis
- Species: S. melanotricha

Binomial name
- Stelis melanotricha (Cockerell, 1925)

Species of bee

Stelis melanotricha is a species of cuckoo bee in the family Megachilidae. It is found in North America.
