= Stelis perpulchra =

Scientific classification
- Kingdom: Animalia
- Phylum: Arthropoda
- Clade: Pancrustacea
- Class: Insecta
- Order: Hymenoptera
- Family: Megachilidae
- Genus: Stelis
- Species: S. perpulchra

Binomial name
- Stelis perpulchra Crawford, 1916

Species of bee

Stelis perpulchra is a species of cuckoo bee in the family Megachilidae. It is found in Central America and North America.
