= Stelis laticincta =

Scientific classification
- Domain: Eukaryota
- Kingdom: Animalia
- Phylum: Arthropoda
- Class: Insecta
- Order: Hymenoptera
- Family: Megachilidae
- Genus: Stelis
- Species: S. laticincta

Binomial name
- Stelis laticincta Cresson, 1878

Species of bee

Stelis laticincta is a species of cuckoo bee in the family Megachilidae. It is found in North America.
