= Stelis rudbeckiarum =

Scientific classification
- Kingdom: Animalia
- Phylum: Arthropoda
- Class: Insecta
- Order: Hymenoptera
- Family: Megachilidae
- Genus: Stelis
- Species: S. rudbeckiarum

Binomial name
- Stelis rudbeckiarum Cockerell, 1904

Species of bee

Stelis rudbeckiarum is a species of cuckoo bee in the family Megachilidae. It is found in Central America and North America.
