= Megachile angelarum =

Scientific classification
- Kingdom: Animalia
- Phylum: Arthropoda
- Class: Insecta
- Order: Hymenoptera
- Family: Megachilidae
- Genus: Megachile
- Species: M. angelarum

Binomial name
- Megachile angelarum Cockerell, 1902

Species of bee

Megachile angelarum is a species of bee in the Megachilidae family.

== Leafcutter bees ==
Solitary bees, such as leafcutters, do not form colonies. Unlike social insects (ants, yellow jackets, honeybees), leafcutters work alone building isolated nests. Similar to honeybees, female bees perform nearly all essential tasks of brood rearing. These native insects perform essential tasks, pollinating wild plants. The alfalfa leaf cutter bee (Megachile rotundata), native to Europe, has been semi-domesticated for crop pollination. In North America, the species was deliberately imported to assist in the pollination of food crops, but has now become feral and widespread.

Cockerell, 1902. South. Calif. Acad. Sci. Bull. 1: 70 (♀)

== Taxonomy and naming ==
The genus Megachile is a cosmopolitan group of solitary bees, often called leafcutter bees. While other genera within the family Megachilidae may chew leaves or petals into fragments to build their nests, certain species within Megachile neatly cut pieces of leaves or petals, hence their common name. The genus Megachile is one of the largest genera of bees, with almost 1500 species.

== Life cycle and behavior ==
1. Nesting Behavior: Megachile angelarum is a cavity-nesting bee. It collects resin and gum to build its nest. While it looks similar to a leafcutting bee, it does not actually cut leaves or petals like other leafcutters.
2. Solitary Behavior: As a solitary bee, Megachile angelarum constructs its nest independently. Unlike social bees, it does not rely on a colony structure for tasks like brood rearing.
3. Pollination Role: These native bees are essential pollinators, contributing to the reproduction of various plant species. Their solitary lifestyle allows them to focus on individual nesting and foraging activities.

== Distribution and habitat ==
- Distribution: Megachile angelarum occurs in the following regions:
  - Southern British Columbia, Canada
  - California, Arizona, and New Mexico in the United States
  - Baja California, Mexico
  - Ascher and Pickering (2014) also map its presence from southern British Columbia south to Tijuana, Mexico, with most records in California.
- Habitat: These bees inhabit various natural landscapes within their range. They can be found in diverse habitats such as forests, grasslands, and urban areas. Their nesting sites include cavities in wood, plant stems, and other suitable sheltered locations.

== Morphology and identification ==
1. Morphological Features:
  - Metasoma: The female M. angelarum can be recognized by its parallel-sided metasoma (abdomen).
  - Mandibles: Unlike some other bees, M. angelarum has mandibles that lack cutting edges.
  - Apical White Fasciae: The complete apical white fasciae on tergites T1 to T5 (visible segments of the abdomen) are characteristic of this species.
2. Distinctive Traits:
  - Abdominal Scopa: Look for an abdominal scopa (a specialized brush of hairs) on the underside of the abdomen.
  - Grooves on T2-T4: Deep grooves on tergites T2 to T4 are another identifying feature.
  - Lip on T6: The last visible segment (T6) in a female has a distinct turned-up lip at the very end of the bee.
3. Comparison with Similar Species:
  - M. angelarum most closely resembles Megachile campanulae. However, females of M. campanulae lack the apical white fascia on T5.

Morphologically, they most resemble Megachile campanulae.

== See also ==
- Bee
- Pollinators
- Pollinator decline
