= Monodontomerus obscurus =

Scientific classification
- Kingdom: Animalia
- Phylum: Arthropoda
- Class: Insecta
- Order: Hymenoptera
- Family: Torymidae
- Genus: Monodontomerus
- Species: M. obscurus

Binomial name
- Monodontomerus obscurus Westwood, 1833

Synonyms
- Callimome pubescen Monodontomerus anthophora Monodontomerus intermedius Monodontomerus masii and others

Species of wasp

Monodontomerus obscurus is a parasitic wasp in the family Torymidae. It is native to Europe and has been introduced to North America.

List of Hosts:

Osmia

Stelis chlorocyanea

Bolivaria brachyptera oothecae
