= Megachile odontostoma =

Scientific classification
- Kingdom: Animalia
- Phylum: Arthropoda
- Class: Insecta
- Order: Hymenoptera
- Family: Megachilidae
- Genus: Megachile
- Species: M. odontostoma

Binomial name
- Megachile odontostoma Cockerell, 1924

Synonyms
- Megachile odonostoma

Species of leafcutter bee (Megachile)

Megachile odontostoma is a species of bee in the family Megachilidae.
