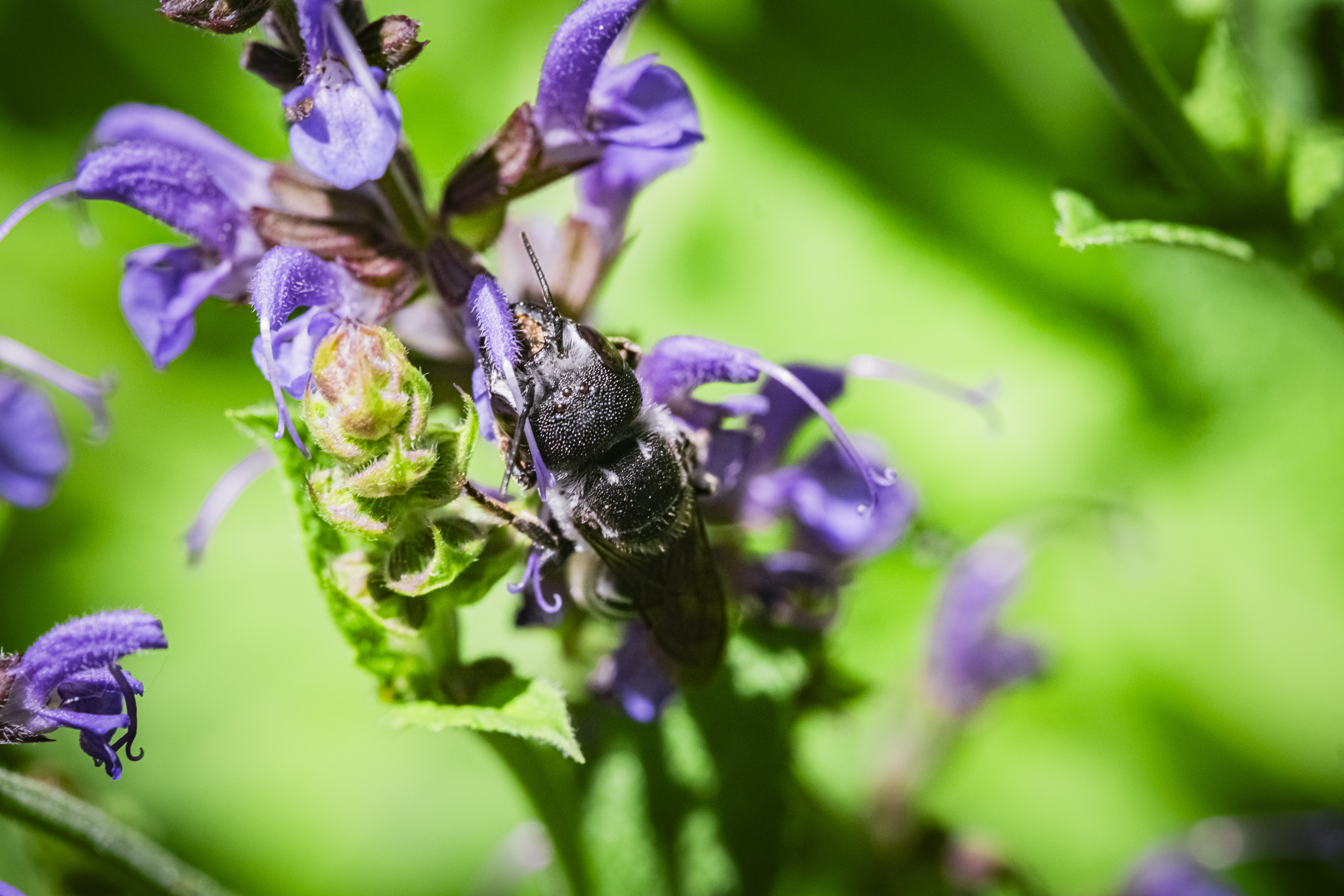

Conservation status
- Imperiled (NatureServe)

Scientific classification
- Domain: Eukaryota
- Kingdom: Animalia
- Phylum: Arthropoda
- Class: Insecta
- Order: Hymenoptera
- Family: Megachilidae
- Genus: Megachile
- Species: M. rugifrons

Binomial name
- Megachile rugifrons (Smith, 1854)

= Megachile rugifrons =

Species of leafcutter bee (Megachile)

Megachile rugifrons is a species of bee in the family Megachilidae. It was described by Smith in 1854.
