= Megachile jamaicae =

Scientific classification
- Kingdom: Animalia
- Phylum: Arthropoda
- Class: Insecta
- Order: Hymenoptera
- Family: Megachilidae
- Genus: Megachile
- Species: M. jamaicae

Binomial name
- Megachile jamaicae (Raw, 1984)

Species of leafcutter bee (Megachile)

Megachile jamaicae is a species of bee in the family Megachilidae. It was described by Raw in 1984.
