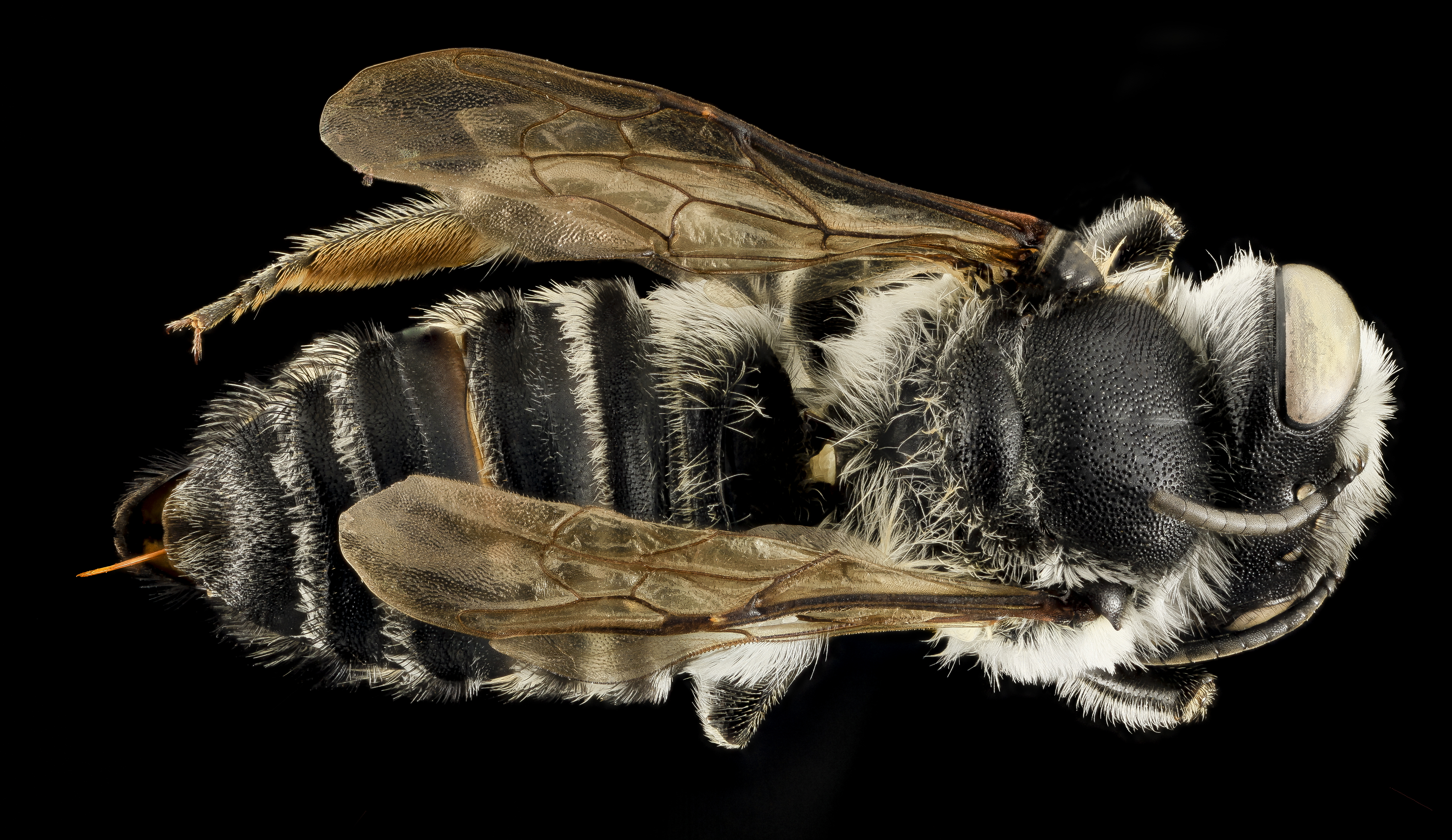

Scientific classification
- Kingdom: Animalia
- Phylum: Arthropoda
- Clade: Pancrustacea
- Class: Insecta
- Order: Hymenoptera
- Family: Megachilidae
- Genus: Megachile
- Species: M. addenda

Binomial name
- Megachile addenda Cresson, 1878

= Megachile addenda =

Species of leafcutter bee (Megachile)

Megachile addenda is a species of bee in the family Megachilidae. It was described by Ezra Townsend Cresson in 1878. It is a pollinator of cranberries, nesting in sand beds.
