= Megachile abacula =

Scientific classification
- Kingdom: Animalia
- Phylum: Arthropoda
- Class: Insecta
- Order: Hymenoptera
- Family: Megachilidae
- Genus: Megachile
- Species: M. abacula

Binomial name
- Megachile abacula Cresson, 1878

Species of bee

Megachile abacula is a species of bee in the Megachilidae family.

== Leafcutter bees ==
Like other Megachile species, M. abacula likely selects smooth, non-latex leaves from plants in the Rosid clade, particularly Fabaceae, for constructing its brood cells. Solitary bees, such as leafcutters, do not form colonies. Unlike social insects (ants, yellow jackets, honeybees), leafcutter bees work alone building isolated nests. Similar to honeybees, female bees perform nearly all essential tasks of brood rearing. These native insects perform essential tasks, pollinating wild plants. The alfalfa leaf cutter bee (Megachile rotundata), native to Europe, has been semi-domesticated for crop pollination. In North America, the species was deliberately imported to assist in the pollination of food crops, but has now become feral and widespread.

== Taxonomy and naming ==
The genus Megachile is a cosmopolitan group of solitary bees, often called leafcutter bees. While other genera within the family Megachilidae may chew leaves or petals into fragments to build their nests, certain species within Megachile neatly cut pieces of leaves or petals, hence their common name. The genus Megachile is one of the largest genera of bees, with almost 1500 species.
