= Megachile adelphodonta =

Conservation status
- Vulnerable (NatureServe)

Scientific classification
- Domain: Eukaryota
- Kingdom: Animalia
- Phylum: Arthropoda
- Class: Insecta
- Order: Hymenoptera
- Family: Megachilidae
- Genus: Megachile
- Species: M. adelphodonta

Binomial name
- Megachile adelphodonta Cockerell, 1924

Species of leafcutter bee (Megachile)

Megachile adelphodonta is a species of bee in the family Megachilidae. It was described by Theodore Dru Alison Cockerell in 1924.
