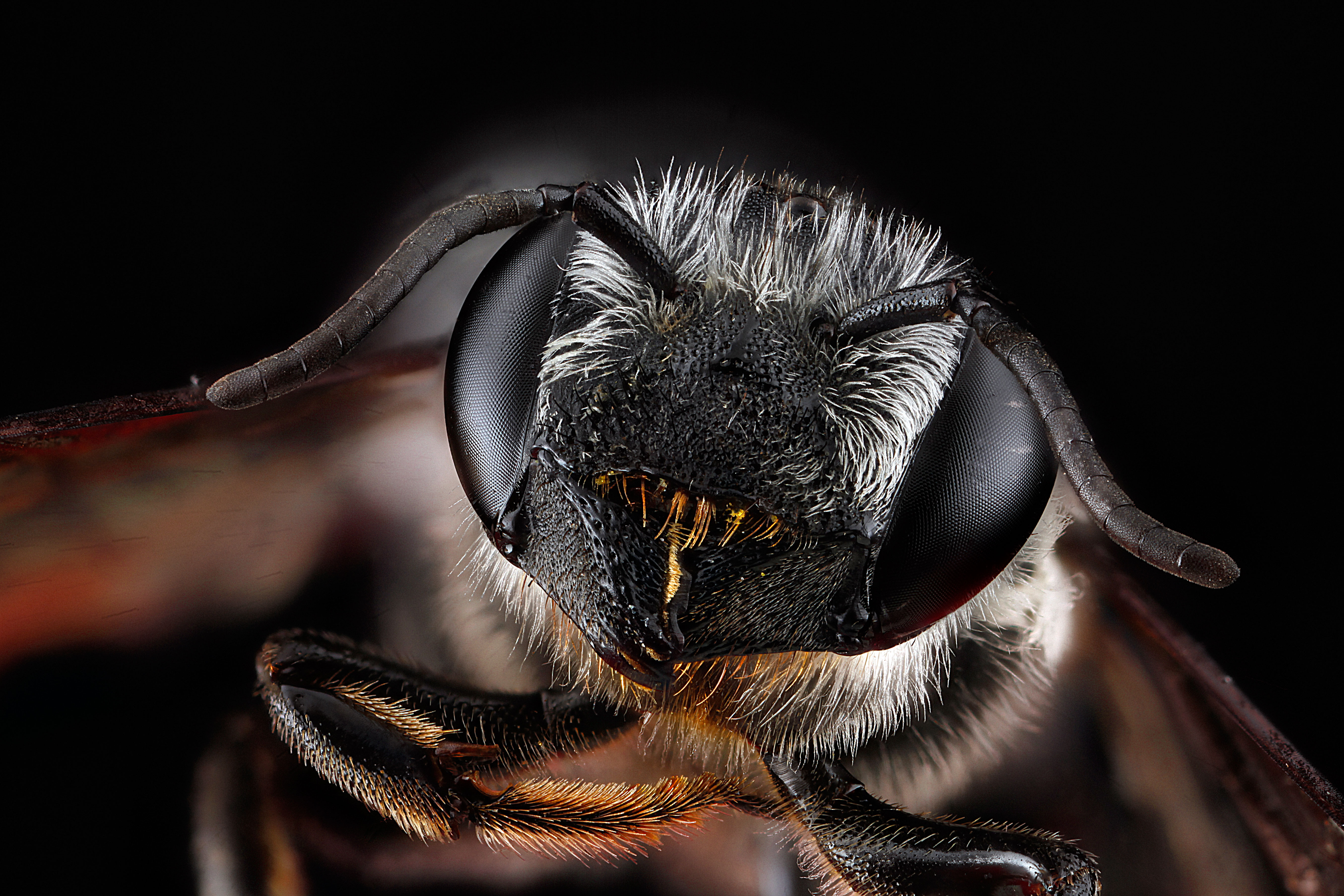

Scientific classification
- Domain: Eukaryota
- Kingdom: Animalia
- Phylum: Arthropoda
- Class: Insecta
- Order: Hymenoptera
- Family: Megachilidae
- Genus: Megachile
- Species: M. frugalis

Binomial name
- Megachile frugalis Cresson, 1872

= Megachile frugalis =

Species of leafcutter bee (Megachile)

Megachile frugalis is a species of bee in the family Megachilidae. It was described by Cresson in 1872.
