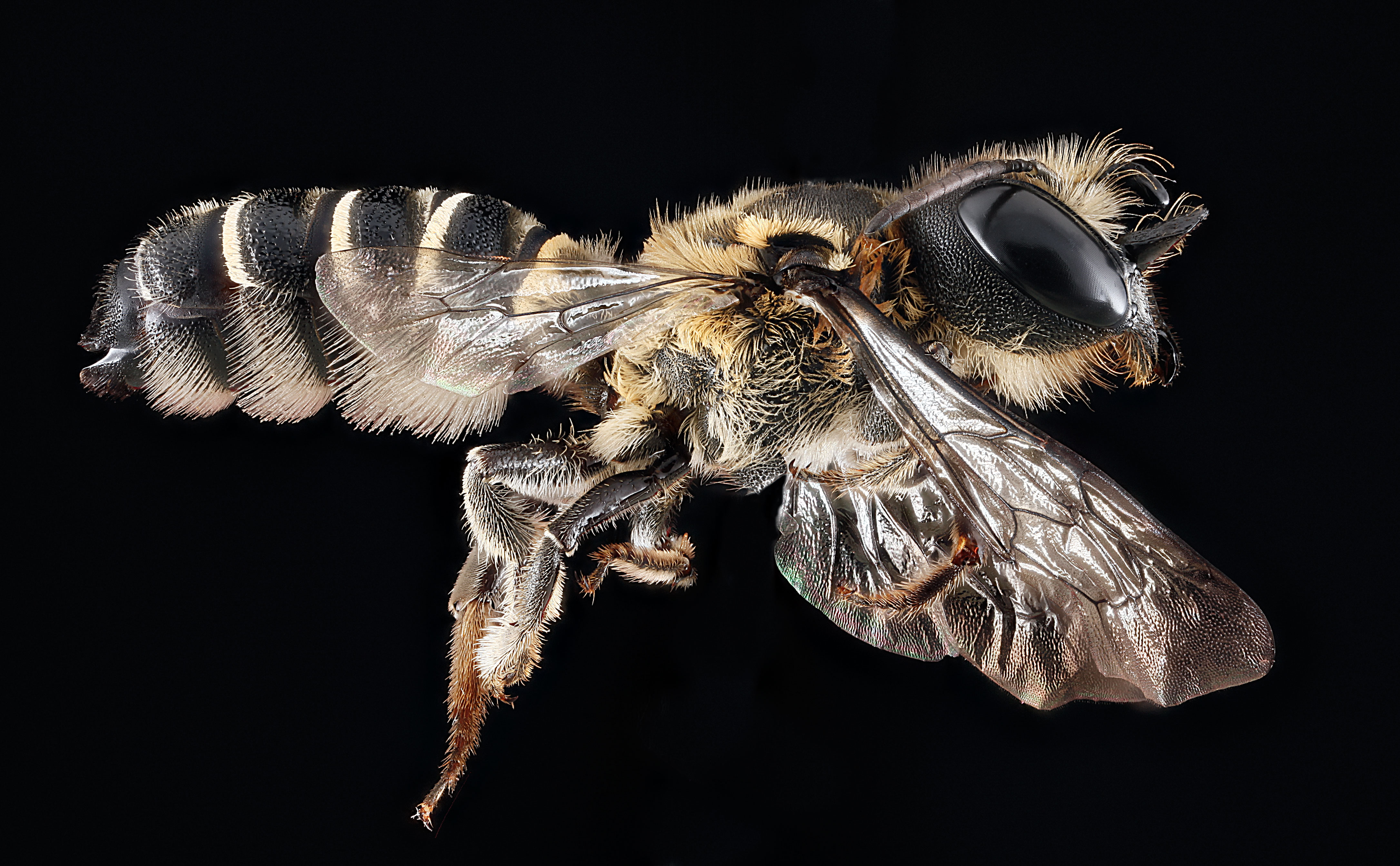

Scientific classification
- Domain: Eukaryota
- Kingdom: Animalia
- Phylum: Arthropoda
- Class: Insecta
- Order: Hymenoptera
- Family: Megachilidae
- Genus: Megachile
- Species: M. armaticeps

Binomial name
- Megachile armaticeps Cresson, 1869

= Megachile armaticeps =

Species of leafcutter bee (Megachile)

Megachile armaticeps is a species of bee in the family Megachilidae. It was described by Ezra Townsend Cresson in 1869.
