= Megachile axyx =

Scientific classification
- Domain: Eukaryota
- Kingdom: Animalia
- Phylum: Arthropoda
- Class: Insecta
- Order: Hymenoptera
- Family: Megachilidae
- Genus: Megachile
- Species: M. axyx

Binomial name
- Megachile axyx (Snelling, 1990)

Species of leafcutter bee (Megachile)

Megachile axyx is a species of bee in the family Megachilidae. It was described by Snelling in 1990.
