= Megachile davidsoni =

Conservation status
- Vulnerable (NatureServe)

Scientific classification
- Kingdom: Animalia
- Phylum: Arthropoda
- Class: Insecta
- Order: Hymenoptera
- Family: Megachilidae
- Genus: Megachile
- Species: M. davidsoni

Binomial name
- Megachile davidsoni Cockerell, 1902

Species of leafcutter bee (Megachile)

Megachile davidsoni is a species of bee in the family Megachilidae. It was described by Theodore Dru Alison Cockerell in 1902.

== Location ==
Megachile davidsoni can be found in the south-west of California, United States.
