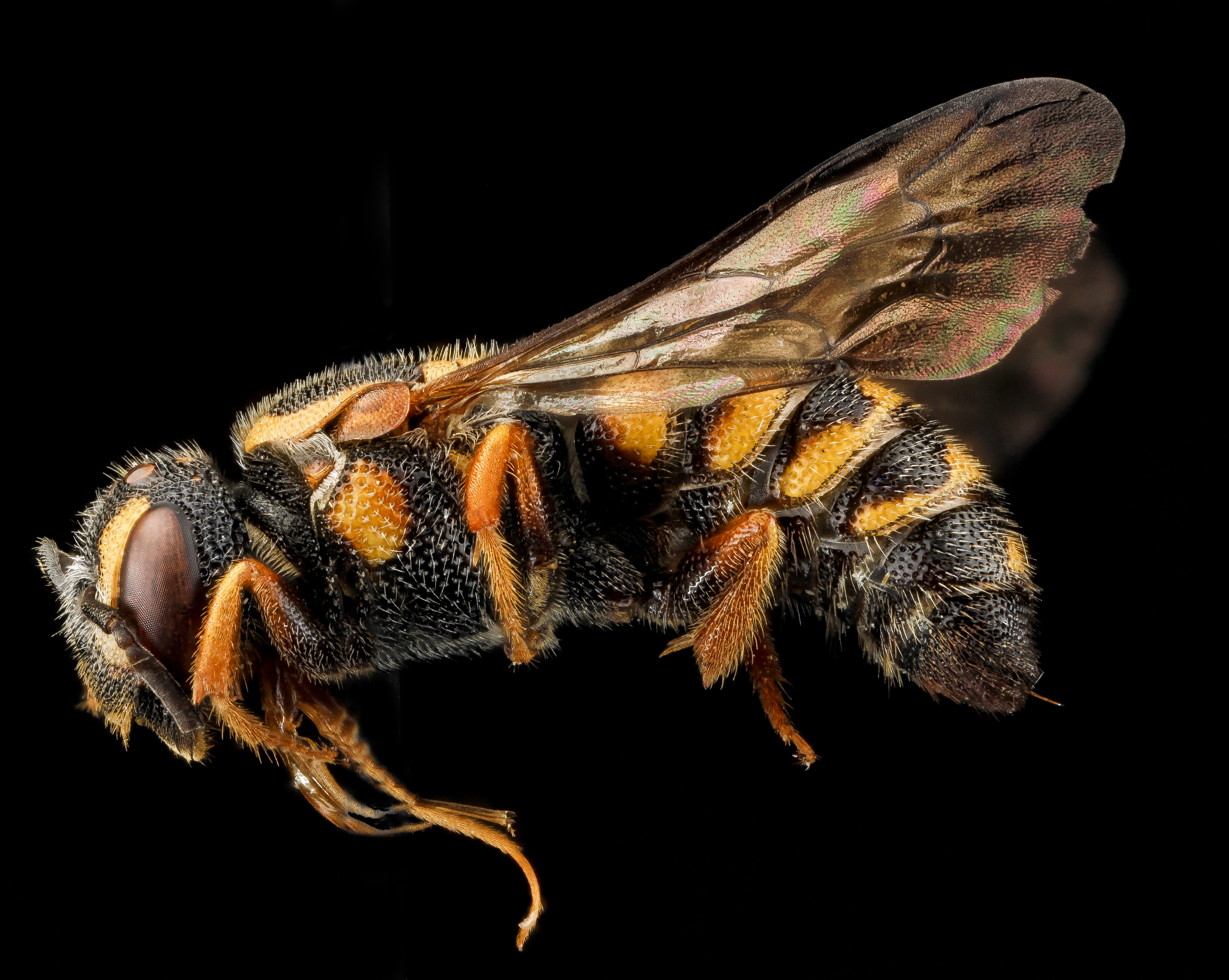

Conservation status
- Unranked (NatureServe)

Scientific classification
- Kingdom: Animalia
- Phylum: Arthropoda
- Clade: Pancrustacea
- Class: Insecta
- Order: Hymenoptera
- Family: Megachilidae
- Genus: Stelis
- Species: S. louisae

Binomial name
- Stelis louisae Cockerell, 1911

Synonyms
- Stelis floridana Graenicher, 1928

= Stelis louisae =

Species of bee

Stelis louisae is a cuckoo bee in the family Megachilidae. It was described by Theodore Dru Alison Cockerell in 1911. It lives in the eastern United States and Ontario, Canada. It sometimes visits Helianthus flowers, and is active from March to September.
