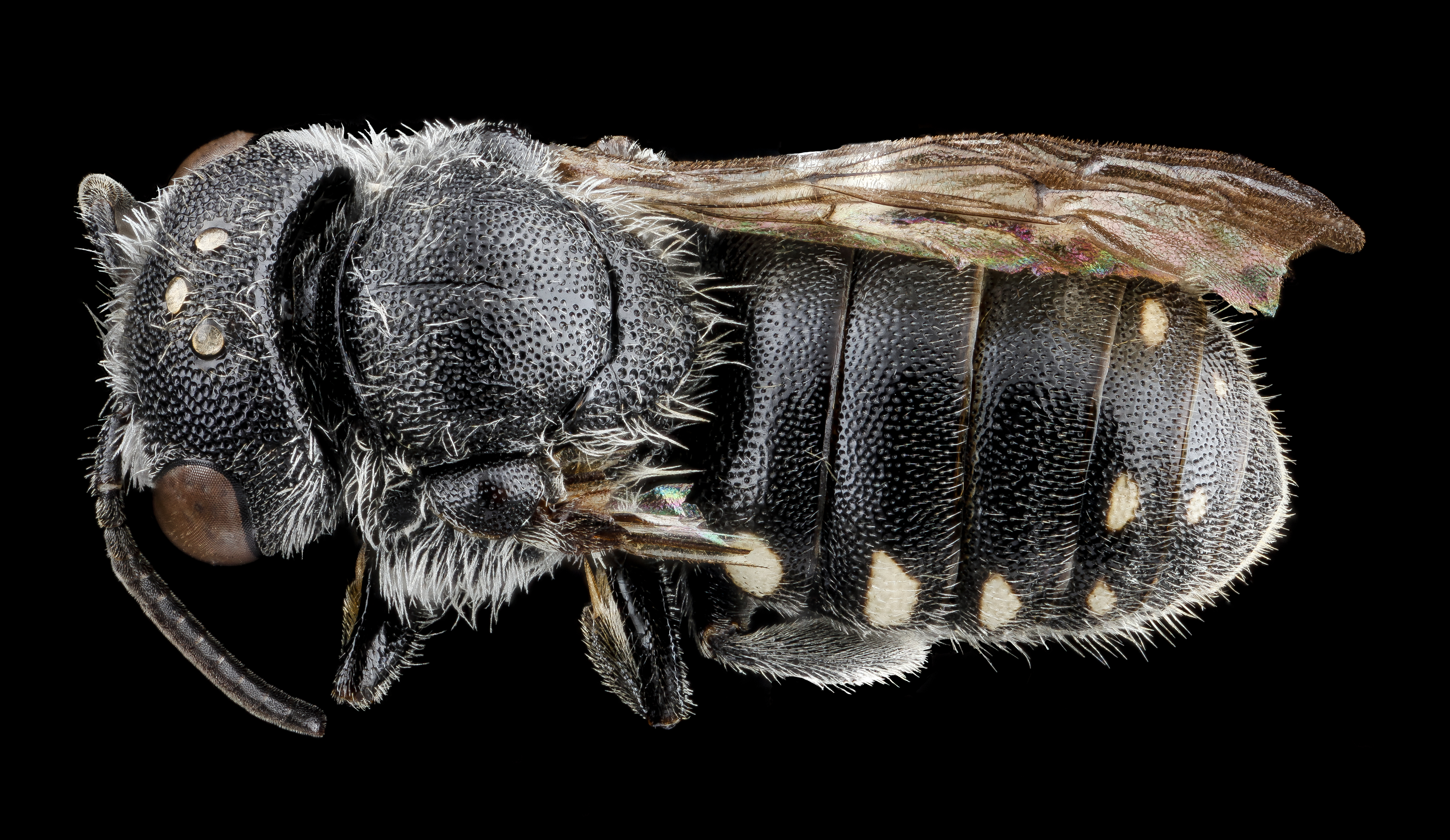

Scientific classification
- Domain: Eukaryota
- Kingdom: Animalia
- Phylum: Arthropoda
- Class: Insecta
- Order: Hymenoptera
- Family: Megachilidae
- Genus: Stelis
- Species: S. lateralis

Binomial name
- Stelis lateralis Cresson, 1864

= Stelis lateralis =

Species of bee

Stelis lateralis is a species of cuckoo bee in the family Megachilidae. It is found in Central America and North America.

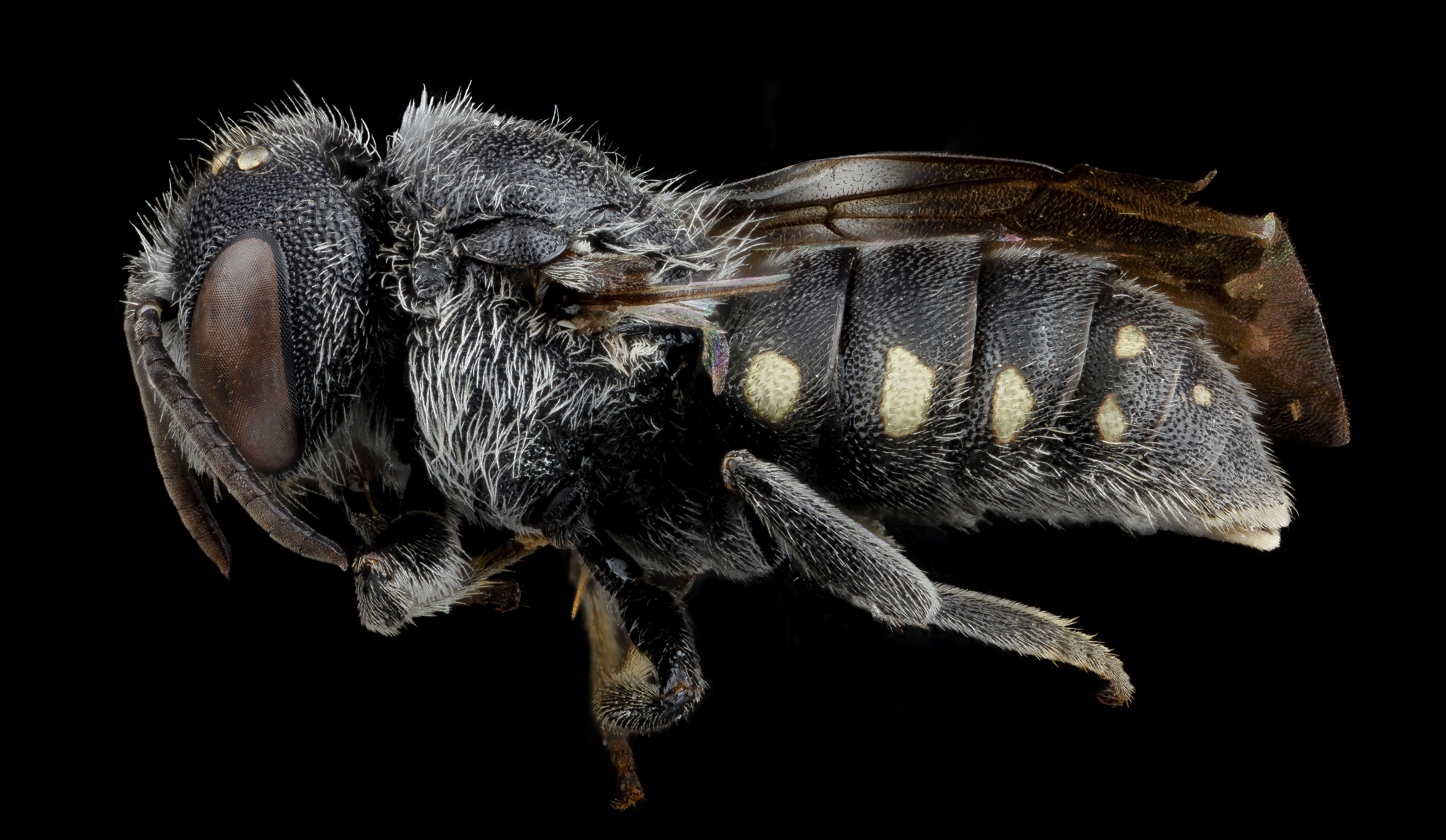

== Subspecies ==
- Stelis lateralis lateralis
- Stelis lateralis permaculata Cockerell
