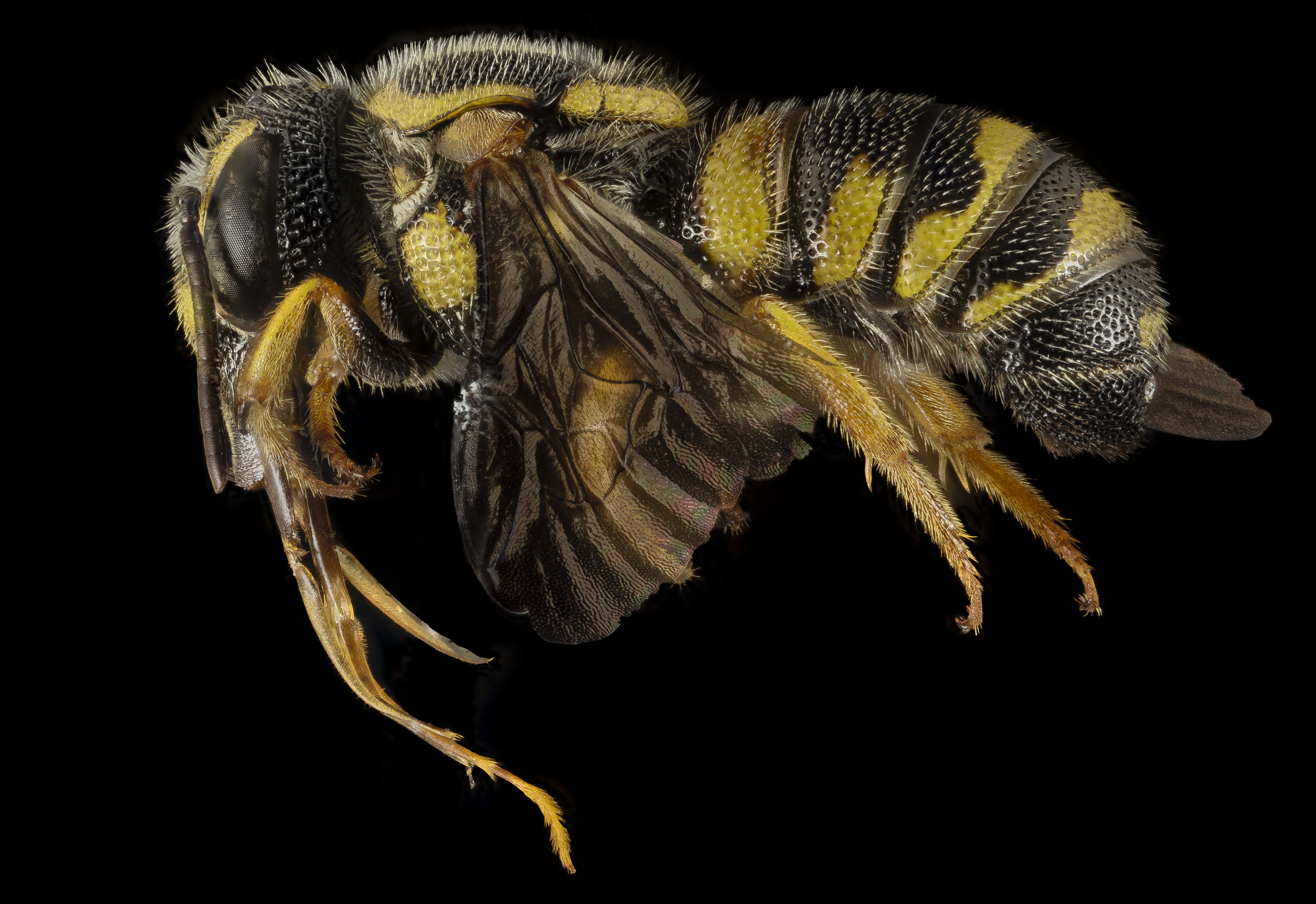

Scientific classification
- Domain: Eukaryota
- Kingdom: Animalia
- Phylum: Arthropoda
- Class: Insecta
- Order: Hymenoptera
- Family: Megachilidae
- Genus: Stelis
- Species: S. costalis

Binomial name
- Stelis costalis Cresson, 1872

= Stelis costalis =

Species of bee

Stelis costalis is a species of cuckoo bee in the family Megachilidae. It is found in Central America and North America.
