= Charles Robertson (entomologist) =

American entomologist

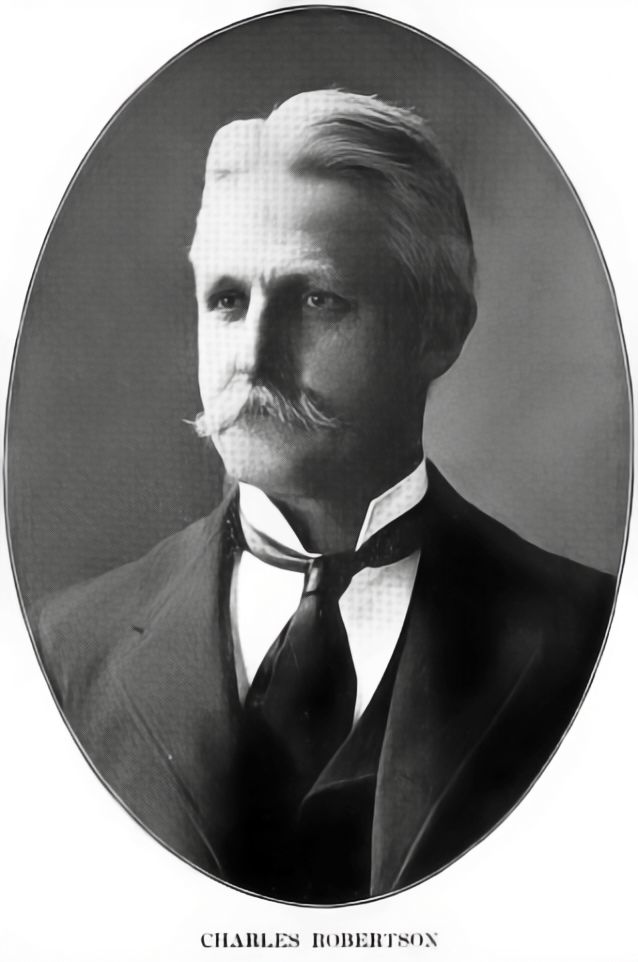
- Born: June 12, 1859; Carlinville, Illinois
- Died: June 17, 1935 (aged 76)
- Citizenship: United States
- Education: Blackburn University
- Spouse: Alice McDonald Venable
- Children: 1
- Scientific career
- Fields: Entomology

Charles Robertson (1858–1935) was an American entomologist specializing in bees. He carried out what is still the single most intensive study of flower-visiting insects of a single locality, culminating in a 221-page book published in 1928 under the title Flowers and Insects.

== Personal life ==
Charles Robertson was born to parents Dr. William Robertson (1803 -1880) and Nancy Robertson, née Halliday (b.1821), married October 18, 1842. His father, William, was a physician turned farmer and general merchandiser, and his mother, Nancy, was the daughter of a reverend. Charles married Alice McDonald Venable in November 1879 and they had one child, Mary. Robertson died 17 June 1935 in Carlinville, Illinois.

== Work ==
Charles Robertson carried out what is still the single most intensive study of flower-visiting insects of a single locality, culminating in a 221-page book published in 1928 under the title Flowers and Insects. From among the specimens he collected in the process of doing this study, he named over 100 new species of bees and wasps. Scientists in 1970–1972 did a similar survey, and found that most of the bees noted by Robertson were still present. This is presumably due to the existence of bee habitat in hedgerows, on slopes, and in other non-agricultural land in the survey area. The rare bee Andrena lauracea is known only from these two surveys (one bee specimen each) and from two specimens from Texas. Biologists from Washington University in St Louis are currently studying changes in pollinator activity by comparing these older data sets to new data. Study was published in Science, February 2013, Plant-Pollinator Interactions over 120 Years: Loss of Species, Co-Occurrence and Function by Laura A. Burkle1, John C. Marlin, Tiffany M. Knight.[5]

ITIS records citing taxon author "Robertson, 1903"

=== Kingdom Animalia ===
- Bombus auricomus (Robertson, 1903)
- Megachile campanulae (Robertson, 1903)
- Nomada cuneata (Robertson, 1903)
- Nomada dentariae (Robertson, 1903)
- Nomada ovata (Robertson, 1903)
- Sphecodes cressonii (Robertson, 1903)
- Sphecodes illinoensis (Robertson, 1903)
- Triepeolus micropygius Robertson, 1903
- Triepeolus micropygius micropygius Robertson, 1903
- Triepeolus simplex Robertson, 1903

== Publications ==
- Robertson, C. 1896: Notes on bees of the genus Prosopis, with descriptions of new species. The Canadian Entomologist. 28: 136-138.
- Robertson, C. 1897: On the Mexican bees of the genus Augochlora. The Canadian Entomologist. 29: 63-64.
- Robertson, C. 1897: Further notes on sections of Augochlora. The Canadian Entomologist. 29: 176.
- Robertson, C. 1897: North American bees-Descriptions and synonyms. Transactions of the Academy of Science of St. Louis. 7: 315-356.
- Robertson, C. 1898: Cockerell on Panurgus and Calliopsis. The Canadian Entomologist. 30: 101.
- Robertson, C. 1899: On the classification of bees. The Canadian Entomologist. 31: 338-343.
- Robertson, C. 1900: Nomada Sayi and two related new species. The Canadian Entomologist. 32: 293-295.
- Robertson, C. 1900: Some Illinois bees. Transactions of the Academy of Science of St. Louis. 10: 47-55.
- Robertson, C. 1901: Some new or little-known bees. The Canadian Entomologist. 33: 229-231.
- Robertson, C. 1902: Some new or little-known bees - II. The Canadian Entomologist. 34: 48-49.
- Robertson, C. 1902: Synopsis of Halictinae. The Canadian Entomologist. 34: 243-250.
- Robertson, C. 1902: Some new or little-known bees. - IV. The Canadian Entomologist. 34: 321-325.
- Robertson, C. 1902: Synopsis of Andreninae. Transactions of the American Entomological Society. 28: 187-194.
- Robertson, C. 1903: Synopsis of Nomadinae. The Canadian Entomologist. 35: 172-179.
- Robertson, C. 1903: Synopsis of Epeolinae. The Canadian Entomologist. 35: 284-288.
- Robertson, C. 1903: Synopsis of Sphecodinae. Entomological News. 14: 103-107.
- Robertson, C. 1904: Synopsis of Anthophila. The Canadian Entomologist. 36: 37-43.
- Robertson, C. 1904: Synopsis of Prosopis and Colletes, with supplementary notes and descriptions. The Canadian Entomologist. 36: 273-278.
- Robertson, C. 1905: Some new or little-known been. - V. The Canadian Entomologist. 37: 236-237.
- Robertson, C. 1918: Some genera of bees. Entomological News. 29: 91-92.

1896: Notes on bees of the genus Prosopis
