= Megachile rawi =

Scientific classification
- Domain: Eukaryota
- Kingdom: Animalia
- Phylum: Arthropoda
- Class: Insecta
- Order: Hymenoptera
- Family: Megachilidae
- Genus: Megachile
- Species: M. rawi

Binomial name
- Megachile rawi Engel, 1999

Species of leafcutter bee (Megachile)

Megachile rawi is a species of bee in the family Megachilidae. It was described by Engel in 1999.
