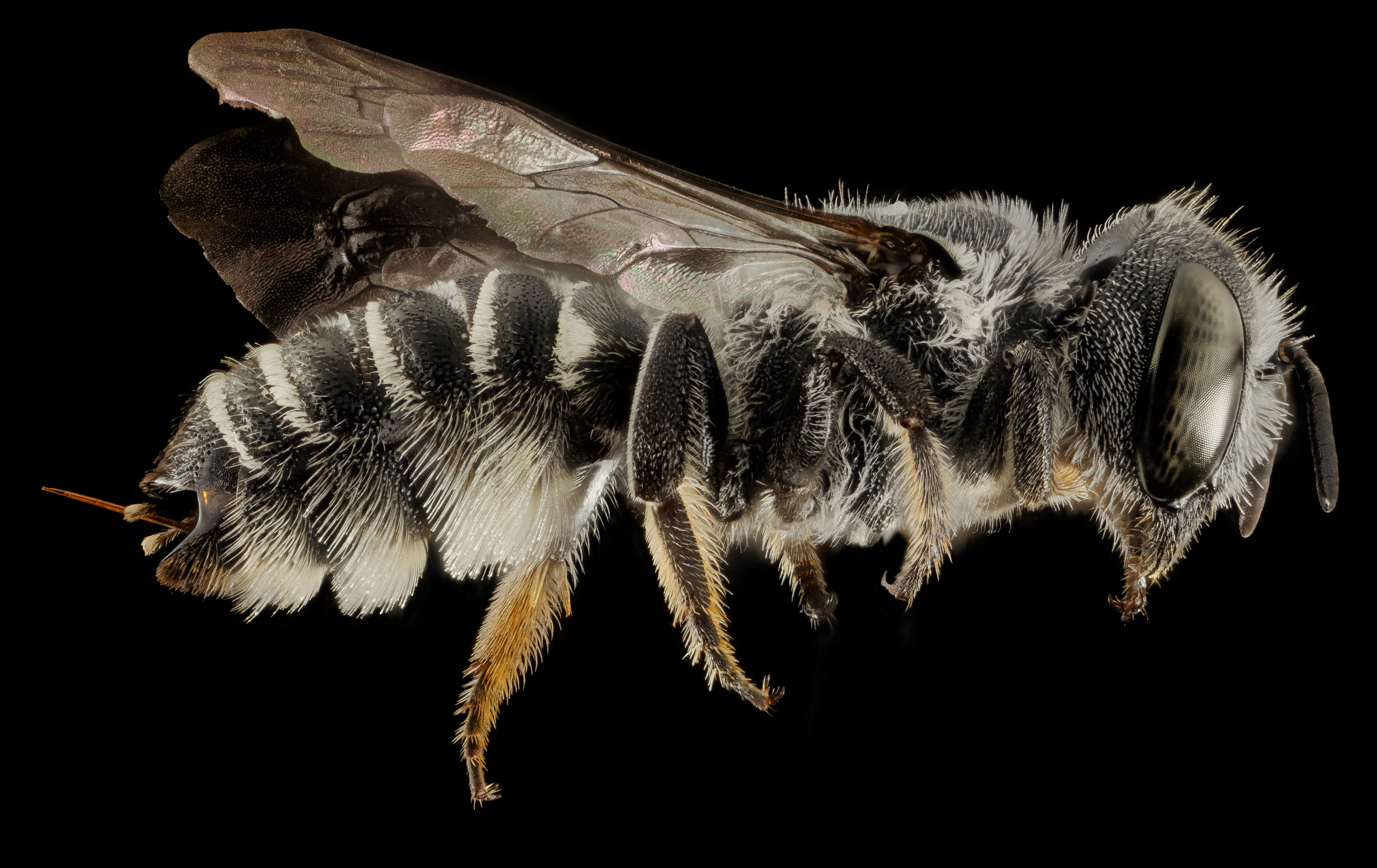

Scientific classification
- Domain: Eukaryota
- Kingdom: Animalia
- Phylum: Arthropoda
- Class: Insecta
- Order: Hymenoptera
- Family: Megachilidae
- Genus: Megachile
- Species: M. exilis

Binomial name
- Megachile exilis Cresson, 1872

= Megachile exilis =

Species of leafcutter bee (Megachile)

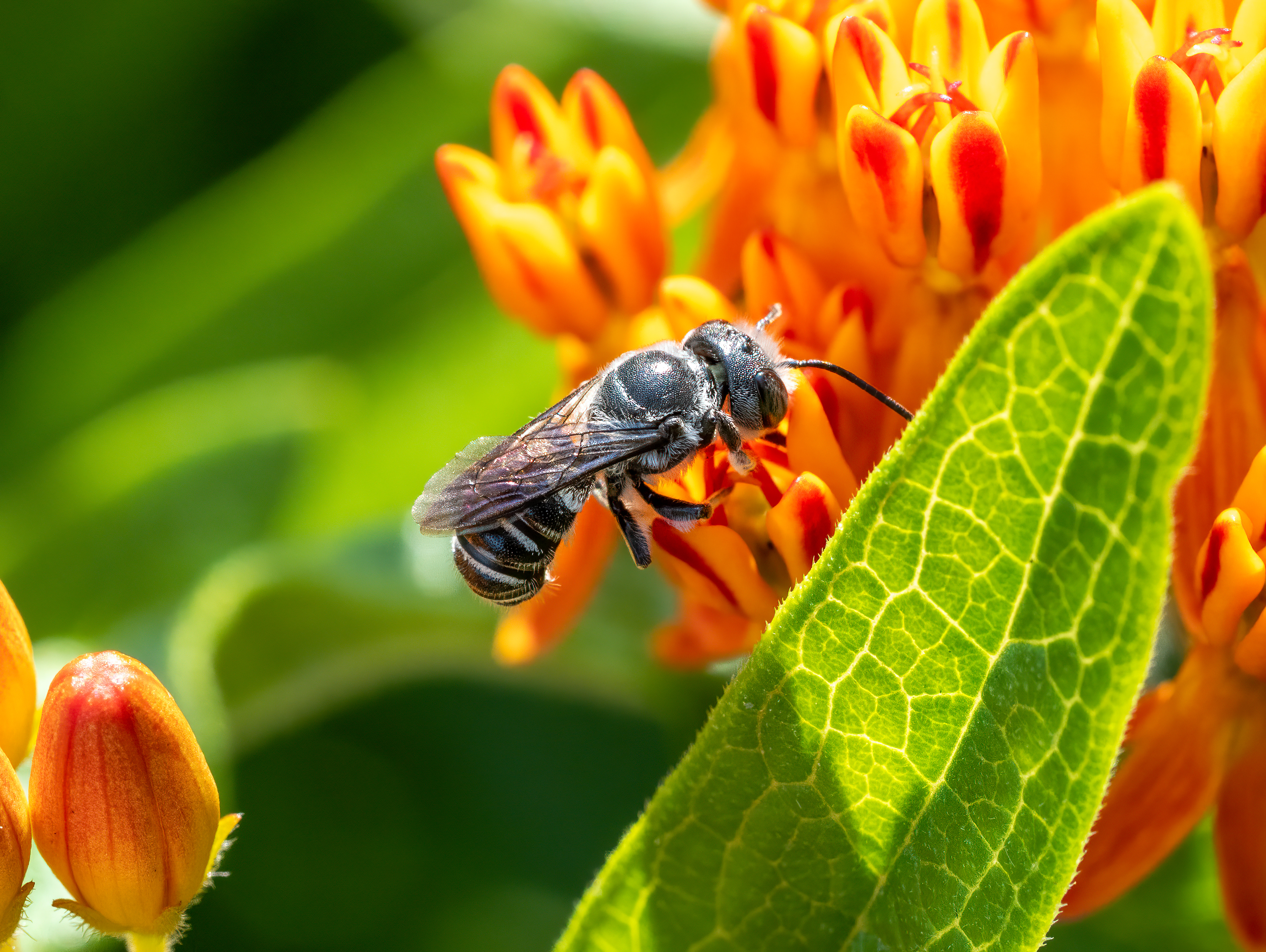
M. exilis in Brooklyn, New York, US

Megachile exilis is a species of bee in the family of Megachilidae. It was first described by Cresson in 1872.
