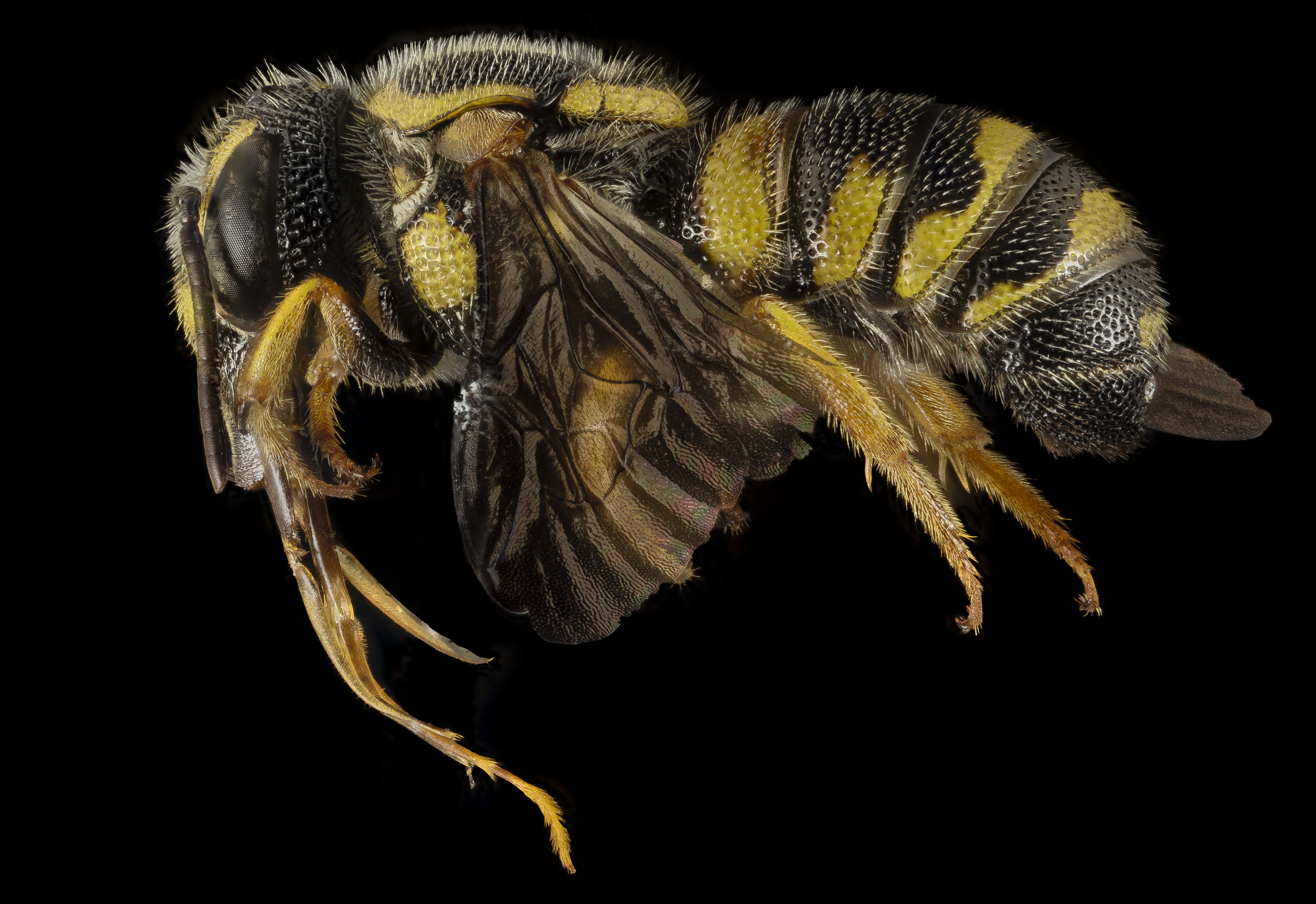
- Stelis costalis

Scientific classification
- Kingdom: Animalia
- Phylum: Arthropoda
- Clade: Pancrustacea
- Class: Insecta
- Order: Hymenoptera
- Family: Megachilidae
- Subfamily: Megachilinae
- Tribe: Anthidiini
- Genus: Stelis; Panzer, 1806

= Stelis (bee) =

Genus of bees

Stelis is a genus of kleptoparasitic cuckoo bees in the family Megachilidae. There are at least 100 described species in the genus Stelis.

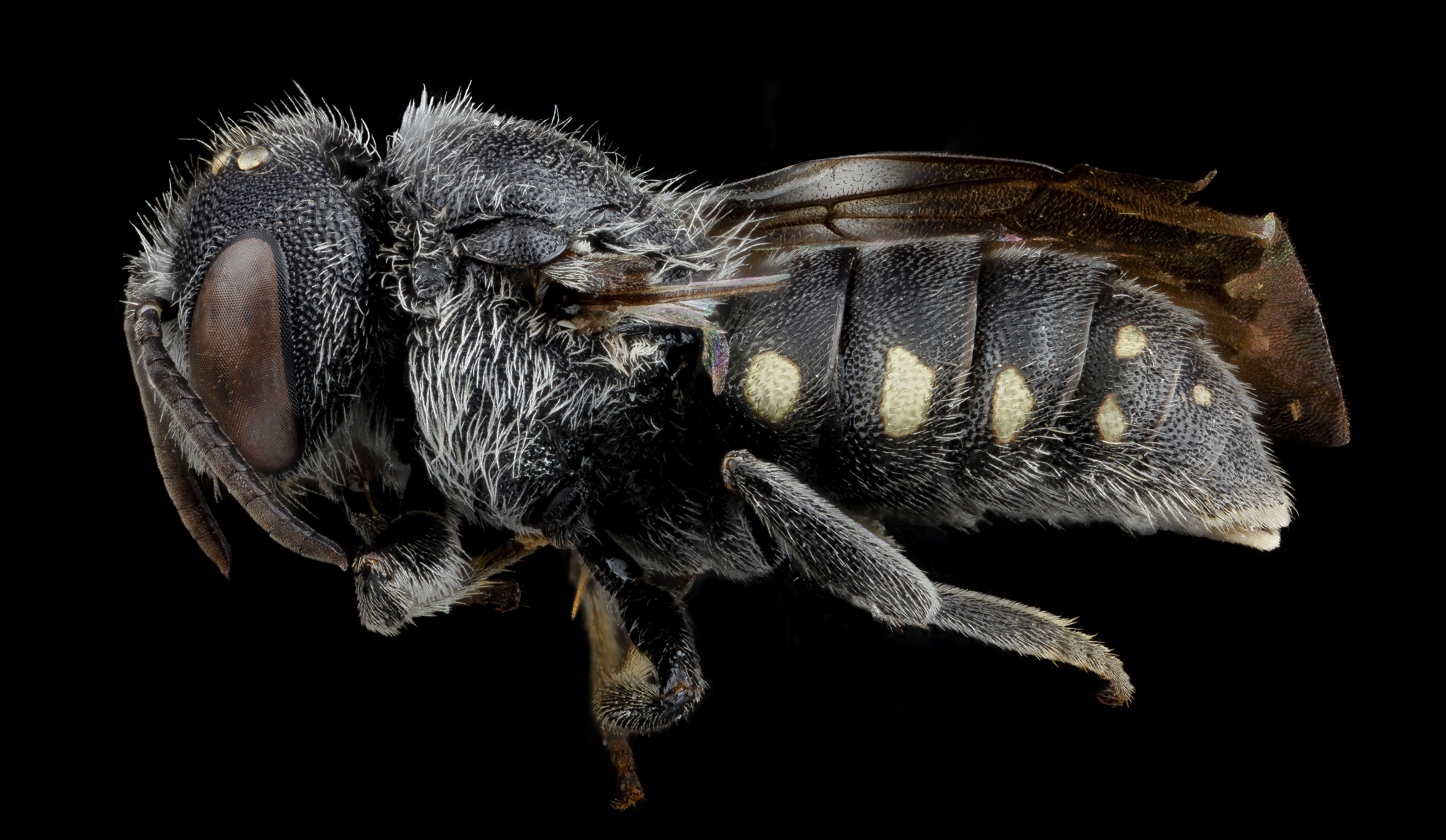
Stelis lateralis

== Description ==
Stelis ater differ somewhat from other thieving bees by being hospicidal (host-killing) at all larval stages, and neither it nor its host larva move much, so it is simply a matter of chance when its growth brings it into contact with the host rather than with just the provisions. This is in contrast to other kleptoparasitic bees which usually have their more mobile first instar larva kill the host larva.

== See also ==
- List of Stelis species
