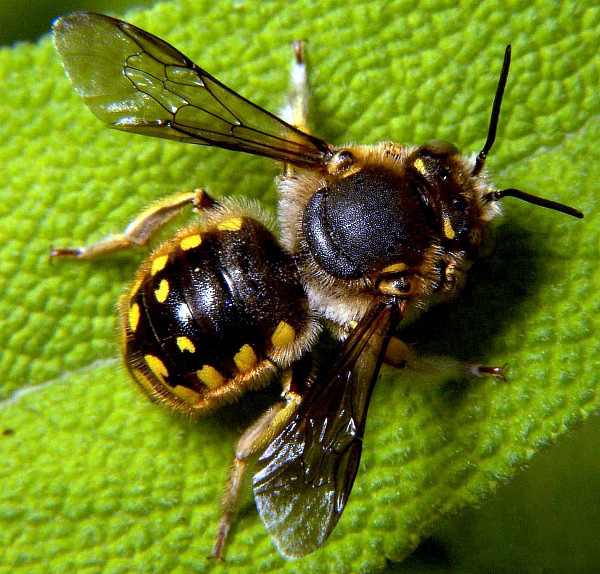
- A male

Conservation status
- Least Concern (IUCN 3.1)

Scientific classification
- Kingdom: Animalia
- Phylum: Arthropoda
- Clade: Pancrustacea
- Class: Insecta
- Order: Hymenoptera
- Family: Megachilidae
- Genus: Anthidium
- Species: A. manicatum

Binomial name
- Anthidium manicatum (Linnaeus, 1758)

Synonyms
- List: Apis manicata Linnaeus, 1758; Apis pervigil Harris, 1776; Apis maculata Fabricius, 1781; Apis fulvipes de Villers, 1789; Apis modesta Christ, 1791; Apis amoenita Christ, 1791; Apis uncata Schrank, 1802; Anthidium maculatum Latreille, 1806; Anthidium marginatum Latreille, 1809; Anthidium obtusatum Lepeletier, 1841; Anthidium productum Lepeletier, 1841; Anthidium manicatum var. nigrithorax Dalla Torre, 1877; Anthidium manicatum var. fasciatum Schirmer, 1915; Anthidium manicatum var. nasicolle Friese, 1917; Anthidium manicatum var. luteus Gribodo, 1924; Anthidium manicatum subcrenulata Alfken, 1930; Anthidium manicatum cyrenaica van der Zanden, 1992

= Anthidium manicatum =

Species of bee

Anthidium manicatum, commonly called the European wool carder bee, is a species of bee in the family Megachilidae, the leaf-cutter bees and mason bees.

They get the name "carder" from their behaviour of scraping hair from leaves such as lamb's ears (Stachys byzantina), similar to the way textile workers card fibers. They carry this hair bundled beneath their bodies to be used as a nest lining. Like other members of the tribe Anthidiini, these bees do not cut leaves or petals as is typical for megachilids. The males engage in territorial behaviour, aggressively chasing other males and pollinators from their territory.

This bee is native to Europe, Asia, and North Africa. It was accidentally introduced into North America from Europe some time in the mid-20th century, first seen in 1963 near Ithaca, New York, and has become an invasive pest. It is now also found in regions of South America, New Zealand, and the Canary Islands. They are generalists, and do not seem to prefer any plant genera for foraging, although in New Zealand, native plants are visited less frequently.

== Taxonomy and phylogeny ==
This bee is in the Anthidium genus, known as the carder bees or potter bees, and consisting of about 80 species. Anthidium is part of the family Megachilidae, which includes the leafcutter bees and mason bees in addition to the carder bees.

== Description and identification ==
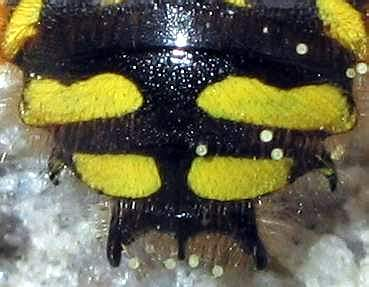
Detail of patterns on the abdomen of a male

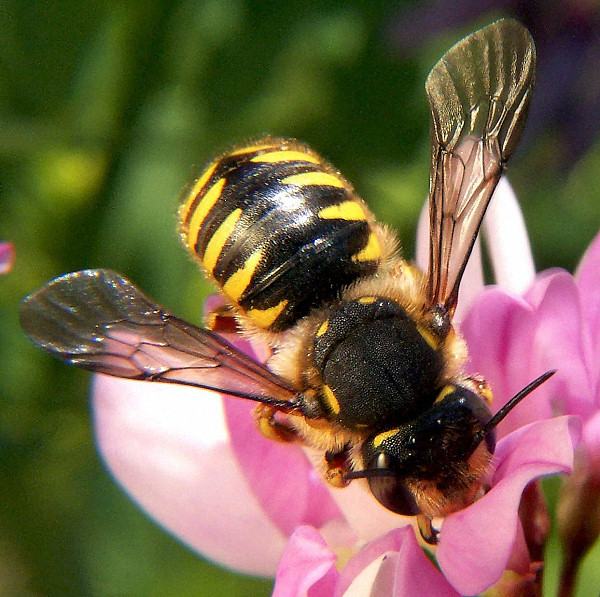
A female

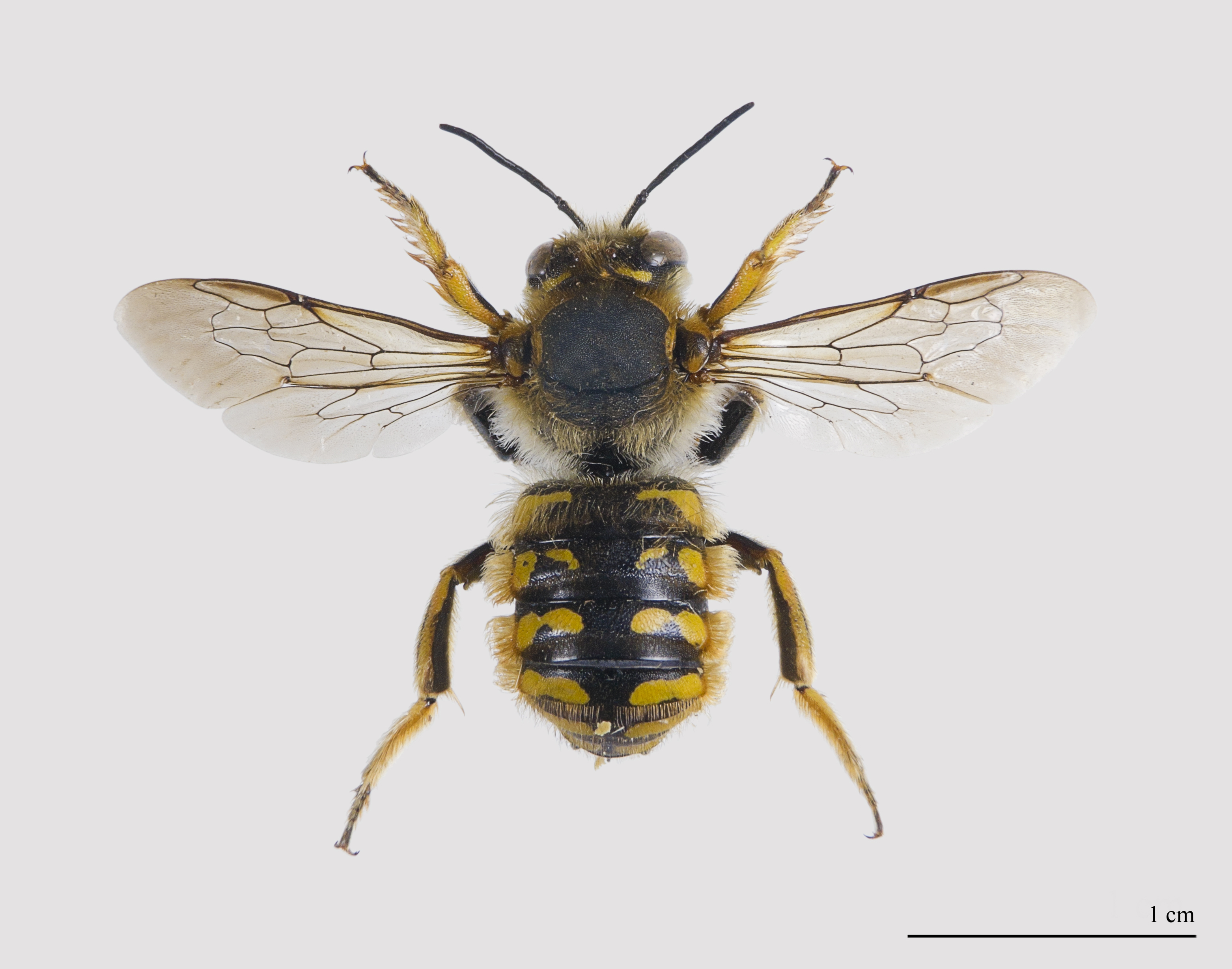
A male

Anthidium manicatum has a wingspan around 20 millimetres (0.79 in), with a body length of about 11–13 mm (0.43–0.51 in) for females, and 14–17 mm (0.55–0.67 in) for males. The males are substantially larger than females.

A. manicatum bees are black and covered with yellow-grey hairs. Their faces and abdomens are covered in yellow spots. A male has a black head and thorax, coated with short yellowish-brown hairs. The cheeks below the antennae, a small spot behind each eye, a bilobate spot on the clypeus, and the mandibles (except the apex) are yellow. The wings are dusky in color. The abdomen is black with grey hairs, with a band of brown hairs at each segment's apex, as well as along the lateral margins. This feature distinguishes male A. manicatum from New World Anthidium species. A yellow spot is on each side of the segments except the seventh. A second pair of spots is often seen on the disks of the fourth and fifth segments. A spine occurs on each side of the sixth and seventh segments at the apex, the seventh having a third thin spine in the middle. The legs exhibit variegation of yellow and are covered with grey hairs.

A female is smaller than the male, but has a similar color pattern. The abdominal spots are smaller and the apex is rounded. Female legs are almost completely black, with very small yellow spots. The anterior sides of the tarsal segments of each leg of a female have fine, soft and small white-colored hairs. This pilosity occurs in most species of Anthidium in the Western Palearctic region.

Males of A. manicatum resemble A. maculosum in appearance. The two species have similar spiniform pygidia, as well as largely rounded sixth sterna (although that of A. manicatum is more so).

== Distribution and habitat ==
A. manicatum is native to parts of Europe, Asia, and North Africa. It is now also found in North America, South American countries such as Argentina, Brazil, Paraguay, and Uruguay, the Canary Islands, and New Zealand (where it was found to be established in 2006).

This insect was accidentally introduced into the United States from Europe sometime prior to 1963, when it was discovered in New York. It has since spread from the northeastern U.S. and southeastern Canada across the United States to California, where it was first collected in 2007. This species' tendency to occupy ready-made nesting sites, usually movable objects, allows it to spread to new locations easily.

In Europe, this species is normally found in gardens, fields, and meadows in the southern part of Wales and England, but is localized in other places within the United Kingdom, where they can be seen from May to September. A. manicatum is the only species of the genus Anthidium that can be found in England.

== Nesting ==
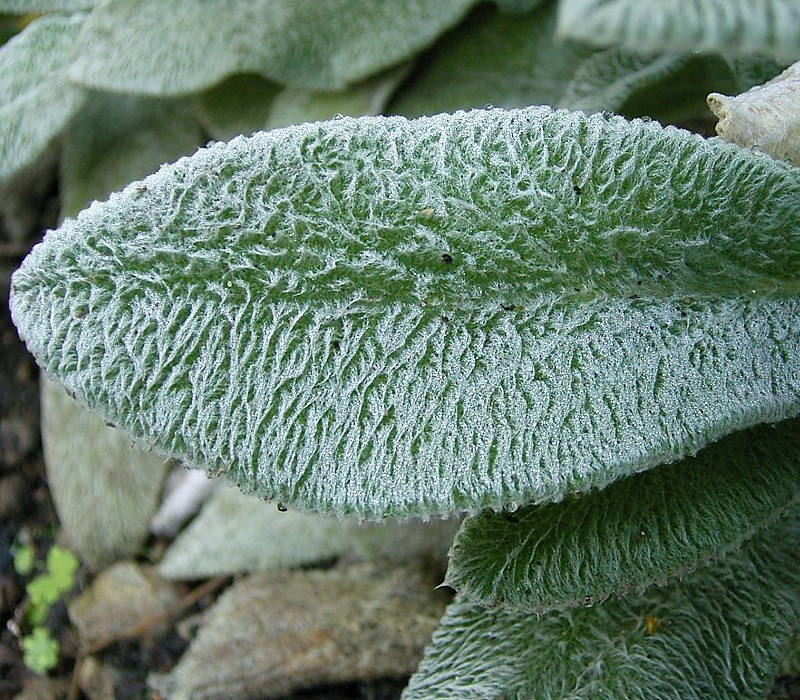
'Wooly' trichomes as seen on Stachys byzantina, used by A. manicatum for nest construction.

Being a member of the Anthidiini tribe of megachilid bees, A. manicatum engages in highly elaborate nesting behavior. These bees construct their nests in pre-existing cavities, using the trichomes of wooly plants such as lamb's ears (Stachys byzantina). Females of A. manicatum use their mandibles, which are sharply toothed, to remove trichomes from the stems and leaves of various plants. They then roll up the trichomes into a ball and bring them to a pre-existing cavity. Inside the cavity, the bees fashion the trichome ball into cells, where they deposit an egg and a provisioning mass consisting of nectar and pollen. The female creates several cells in a cavity. Once finished, she seals the entrance to the cavity with a terminal plug, which consists of inorganic and organic materials that she brings to the nest.

Females tend to build their nests at high locations. This may be to minimize the nest's exposure to parasites and predators. This may also be to avoid nest usurpation by other females of A. manicatum.

=== Materials ===
Besides trichomes, other materials used by a female A. manicatum for building brood cells include mud, stones, resin, and leaves. Some of the plant materials that are collected are hydrophobic, a feature that may serve an antimicrobial function for the nest. Females smear a plant substrate, plant extrafloral trichome secretions, on brood cells. The primary material used to build the cells are plant hairs, or "wool" (hence the name "wool carder bee"), that is collected from the stems and leaves of plants. Females largely use the hairs of Lamiaceae, especially those of the genus Betonica or Stachys. Additionally, females use specialized hair-like structures on the exterior of their tarsi to absorb the secretions of the plant hairs to apply onto the brood cells. These secretions are obtained from different species, such as Anthirrinum, Crepis, and Pelargonium.

== Behavior ==
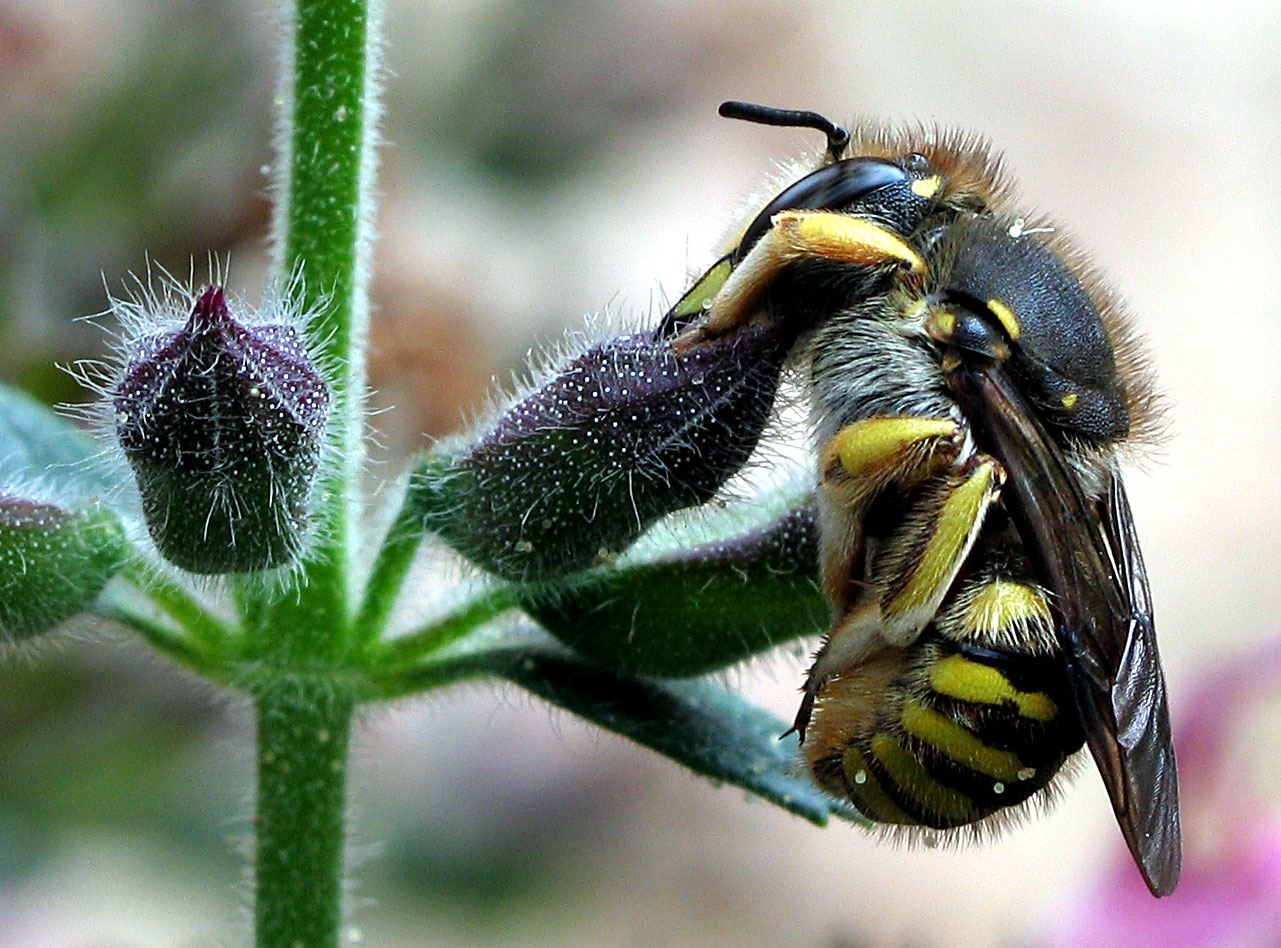
A female on a flower bud

=== Mating behavior ===
The mating system of A. manicatum is unlike those of most other bees. Females exhibit polyandry and continuously mate throughout their reproductive lives. The interval of time between copulations amongst different males can be as short as 35 seconds in length. Males exhibit resource defense polygyny. A. manicatum displays extreme polyandry, which is linked to male territoriality and resource defence of flowering plants. Males claim patches of floral plants, aggressively ward off conspecific males, bees, and other resource competitors, and mate with the females that forage in their territories. Copulations occur repeatedly and regularly in both sexes. Males that are unable to defend their own territory (usually because of their relatively small size) use an alternative "sneaking" tactic. These unfit males receive fewer copulation opportunities than females.

Such mating and territorial behaviour in bees has also been observed in Anthidiellum notatum, Anthidiellum perplexum, and Anthidium banningense. However, males of the genus Anthidiellum chase away intruders rather than physically attacking them, so their aggressive behaviour differs significantly.

==== Resource defence and aggression ====
The territorial mating behaviour of males of A. manicatum occurs when foraging resources are amassed, allowing for monopolization and defence of territories by individual males. Resource defence, as exhibited by male A. manicatum bees, has been thought to benefit females by reducing foraging competition for pollen and nectar. The rate a female visits a territory is highly correlated with the number of flowers in that area. If females forage in sites that are being defended by males and the cost of additional matings is low for female members, then male resource defence and female polyandry may co-evolve.

Males of A. manicatum display highly aggressive behaviour, both to conspecifics and other visitors to the flowers in its territory. In the process of obtaining and defending flowering plant territories, males regularly patrol their territories and attack conspecific males and heterospecific pollinators. This typically consists of brief, aggressive "tackles", but they sometimes lethally injure the pollinators as a result of their aggression. The territorial behaviour of males develops after a period of flight without any localisation in search of a suitable flower patch. They will also defend conspecific females, although they do harass them by holding them immobile and repeatedly attempting to mate.

=== Late male sperm precedence ===
Apparently, no selection pressure exists on males of A. manicatum to be the first to copulate, hence no (or very little) selection pressure arises for them to emerge before females. This is due to the females' polyandrous behaviour, and can also be attributed to the phenomenon of late male sperm precedence.

Patterns of sperm use by the females determine the benefits of resource defence for males. If the female uses only the sperm from her first copulation in a breeding season, then selection will not favor the 'sit-and-wait' strategy of resource defence for the males over strategies that are pre-emptive, such as patrolling nest sites. However, if delayed mating can still ensure a high probability of procreating, then the resource defence strategy will be favoured.

Late male sperm precedence is an experimental situation in which two males mate in sequence with a female and the second male will hold paternity of over 50% of the female's offspring. Although females do have a spermatheca for long-term sperm storage, more recent mates tend to father the brood she produces. This phenomenon might be caused by a variety of mechanisms, including sperm digestion or removal by the female, removal by the next male, or stratification of sperm from different males in the sperm storage organ of the female (i.e. the last sperm in is the first to come out). Studies have shown that A. manicatum males that copulate late in a sequence have a greater than average chance of paternity of the female's eggs. Late male sperm precedence may have fostered the evolution of resource defence in A. manicatum males.

=== Diet and foraging behavior ===
A. manicatum bees consume pollen from flowers of various families. They are thus considered to be generalists. They visit garden flowers and weeds, preferring blue flowers with long throats and Old World origins. Both males and females can maintain a precise static hover near flowers, similar to flies in the family Syrphidae.

== Sexual dimorphism ==
Unlike most other species of Hymenoptera, male A. manicatum bees are larger than females in size, displaying male-biased sexual dimorphism. The selection for larger size in males may have resulted due to their aggressive territorial behavior and subsequent differential mating success. Although it does not tear other males apart, the abdominal armature of a male A. manicatum may have been developed due to territorial aggression, rather than for mating purposes. Male size has been found to correlate with mating success. Smaller males implement alternative mating tactics if they cannot defeat larger males for territory.

The mating behavior of a male A. manicatum can be determined by its relative body size compared to other conspecific males. Territory owners are larger in size than wanderers, and copulate with females more frequently, as well. The number of copulations a male territory owner can achieve varies based on the size of the territory – males with larger territories generally achieve more copulations than those with smaller territories. This difference may be due to the energy expenditure of smaller bees to defend their territory from larger males, the inability of small males to mate on their territory, or female choice of larger males (regardless of territory size). Hence the number of copulations a male obtains is positively correlated with territory quality as well as male size.

== Subspecies ==
The following subspecies are recognized:

- A. m. barbarum Lepeletier, 1841
- A. m. gribodoi Schwarz and Gusenleitner, 2003
- A. m. manicatum (Linnaeus, 1758)
