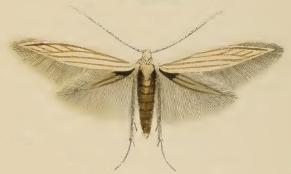

Scientific classification
- Kingdom: Animalia
- Phylum: Arthropoda
- Clade: Pancrustacea
- Class: Insecta
- Order: Lepidoptera
- Family: Coleophoridae
- Genus: Coleophora
- Species: C. lineolea

Binomial name
- Coleophora lineolea (Haworth, 1828)

Synonyms
- Porrectaria lineolea Haworth, 1828

= Coleophora lineolea =

Species of moth

Coleophora lineolea is a moth of the family Coleophoridae. It is found in most of Europe.

The wingspan is 11–14.5 mm (0.43–0.57 in). Adults have yellowish ochre veins. They are on wing from late June to August.

The larvae feed on Labiates including black horehound (Ballota nigra), dead nettles (Lamium species), white horehound (Marrubium vulgare), Phlomis species, Stachys alopecuros, lamb's-ear (Stachys byzantina), betony (Stachys officinalis), stiff hedgenettle (Stachys recta) and hedge woundwort (Stachys sylvatica). Full-grown larvae can be found from the end of May to the end of July.
