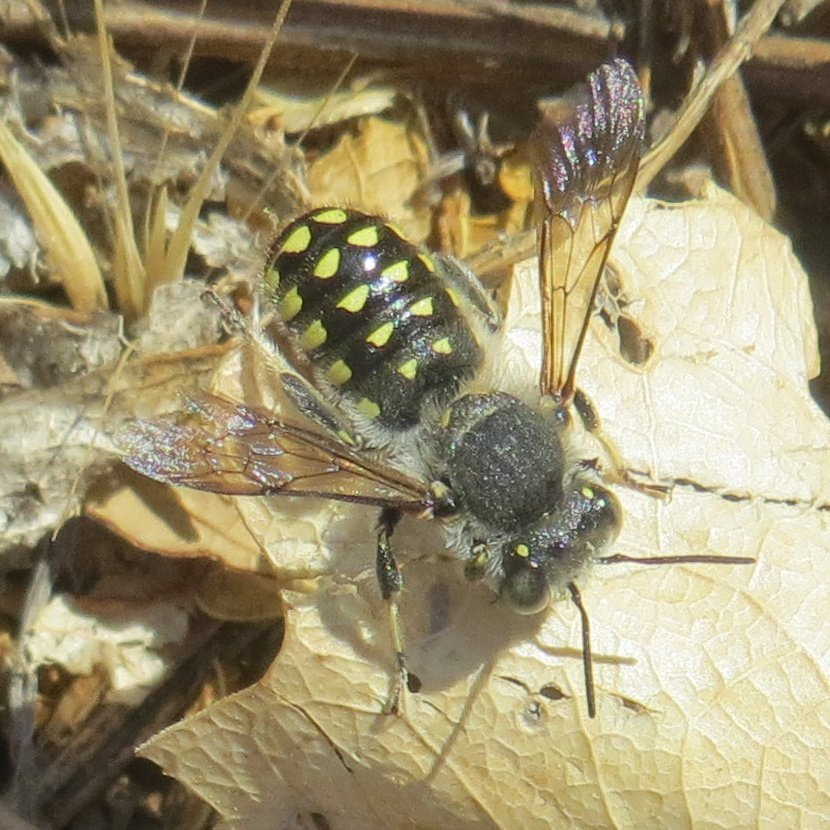
- Male

Scientific classification
- Kingdom: Animalia
- Phylum: Arthropoda
- Clade: Pancrustacea
- Class: Insecta
- Order: Hymenoptera
- Family: Megachilidae
- Genus: Anthidium
- Species: A. maculosum

Binomial name
- Anthidium maculosum Cresson, 1878

Synonyms
- see text

= Anthidium maculosum =

Species of bee

Anthidium maculosum is a species of bee in the family Megachilidae, the leaf-cutter, carder, or mason bees. It is a solitary bee where the males are territorial and the females take part in polyandry. The males of A. maculosum differ from most other males of bee species because the males are significantly larger than females. In addition, subordinate males that act as satellites are smaller than territory-owning males. This species can be found predominately in Mexico and the United States.

== Taxonomy and phylogeny ==
A. maculosum belongs to the subfamily Megachilinae within the hymenopteran family Megachilidae. Megachilinae is divided into 5 tribes: Anthidiini, Dioxyini, Lithurgini, Megachilini, and Osmiini. The genus Anthidium, composed of carder bees, has 92 species of bees. Anthidium is part of the tribe Anthidiini, which is one of the most diverse genera of the family Megachilidae.

== Distribution ==
The distribution of A. maculosum ranges in Middle America and North America. These bees are most commonly found in Mexico and the United States. Observations of this bee have been made range between the Washington–Oregon border in the north and Honduras in the south, and as far west as Texas.

== Description and identification ==
The middle tibia of A. maculosum shows apical spines. Body sizes of these bees seem to correlate with head-widths. Therefore, a bigger head is correlated with a bigger body size. The body sizes of territorial and non-territorial bees are different. Territorial males have larger body sizes and thus correlate with holding territory, while the non-territorial bees are smaller. This smaller size is indicative of them being subordinate. In addition, males are larger than females, which is common in the family Megachilidae. However, this is rare in other bee families where the female is normally larger than the drone or male. A. maculosum nests are built in holes excavated in wood.

== Colony cycle ==
Female solitary bees lay their eggs continuously during the breeding season. They deposit their eggs right before they close their brood cells. These carder bees are diurnal and are active only when the temperatures are above freezing. Moreover, these bees are most active when there are plenty of resources such as flowers, from which they can extract pollen and nectar.

Being solitary bees, this species does not build colonies or store honey. Generally, these bees live for around a year. Most of this time is spent in the nest until they become adults where they are seen outside the nest for three to four weeks. Prior to its adult stage, this solitary bee goes through the stages of being an egg until it progresses to the larva stage and afterward the pupa stage in the brood cell.

== Diet ==
The females of A. maculosum collect pollen and nectar from Monarda pectinata, a flowering mint plant. Therefore, males aggregate and hold territory around these resources to ensure they copulate. This species of bee also lands on Monarda austromontana. Other plants that A. maculosum have been seen to collect pollen and nectar from in the United States include Ballota pseudodictamnus, Salvia chamaedryoides, and Salvia chamaedryoides.

=== Foraging behavior ===
Females forage in multiple territories. Foraging males will try to mate with them, and females will normally allow males to do this even though it may be at a cost because they normally get enough sperm after one mating. Multiple copulations may be costly, but females allow for them because it takes more time to resist than to let it happen. Time will be wasted trying to look for unguarded flowers that are of low quality and are rare. This extra time acquired from submitting is used to forage for their brood provisions. Females normally forage in areas that are held by males because of clumped resource distribution, since it is hard for a female to find the resources she needs otherwise. This food that the female gathers is for her progeny.

== Territorial behavior ==
The males of A. maculosum drive out all flower-visiting insects except for conspecific females. However, if the female refuses to copulate with the male, they too will be driven out. A. maculosum can expect an intruder every 3–4 minutes. As a result, they are constantly defending their territories but not to an unmanageable degree. They spend most of their day flying around their territory making sure it is not being invaded by intruders. If they come across an intruder, both insects will clash and occasionally grapple.

=== Resource defense ===
A. maculosum's mating system is resource defense polygyny. Males of this species of bee fight against each other for control of rich clumps of flowering mint, Monarda pectinata. Females normally aggregate on this plant to collect pollen and nectar for their nests. The mint grows in patches, making it easy for individual male bees to defend their own patch. Normally, a single, highly territorial male will defend his own patch, but if the patch is bigger, a couple male bees will defend a certain section of the plant and subdivide it. They also change the location and size of the territory they guard depending on the availability of pollen and nectar, as well as the level of competition. If males can predict which clumps of resources are more productive, they will patrol these areas more.

== Reproductive behavior ==
=== Non-territorial males ===
There are two types of non-territorial males in A. maculosum. One type is a satellite male that stays in one corner of the territory and does not patrol as widely as the resident owner. The second type is a wandering intruder that visits certain territories repeatedly. For example, a wandering intruder has been seen to go between two different sites 18 times within an hour. The transient bee might call before he is detected by the resident bee. These non-territorial males flee the scene immediately after being approached by the resident bee. If caught by the resident male while attempting to copulate, the non-territorial male and the female he is trying to reproduce with will be violently struck by the resident bee in order to separate the pair. In other cases, the resident male will pull the non-territorial male off the female and continue to copulate with the free female. It seems that in general, non-territorial males mate fewer times than territorial males.

=== Mating behavior ===
Because A. maculosum is a solitary bee, males do not go and look for emerging females. In addition, because females are dispersed widely, this makes it more difficult for males to find emerging females. He arrives at the resource first and lets the females come to him. The male takes part in polygyny to maximize fertilization because males have little genetic gain when mating with females. Therefore, males will mate with multiple females in hopes that this will increase the probability of propagating the male's genes. Sometimes, a male will emit a pheromone in order to attract a female to his flower or territory. A male normally hovers around his territory but when he detects a female, he will stop flying and hover. The male waits for a female A. maculosum to land on a flower and then he quickly charges at her. He grabs her and lands on her back. If he is successful in grabbing her, he will proceed to rub the female's head and thorax with his fore- and midlegs. Next, he falls back on the female and pokes her with his genital claspers before starting copulation. Copulation lasts for about 20–25 seconds, and then the female starts to fight back by moving and kicking. The pair then separates.

=== Evolution of multiple mating in females ===
A. maculosum females are known to take part in polyandrous behavior. Most females collect enough sperm after a single copulation, but take part in multiple copulations during their lifetime. On one hand, taking part in multiple matings takes time away from foraging. On the other hand, monogamy also expends time and energy trying to repel and avoid the male. Under certain conditions, however, it is advantageous for the female to be polyandrous. This is because the costs of monogamy are greater than the costs of polyandry. If mating only takes a short time, this can reduce the cost of multiple copulations. It is advantageous for the female to be polyandrous when she is trying to forage because males normally guard resource rich sites, so females get access to these territories when she mates with these males. This is known as resource defense polygyny when the male controls resources such as food to monopolize females. Also, because males are larger than females, they are more successful in harassing females into mating with them as can be seen by the method of copulation. In other cases, in order for the female to extract the pollen or nectar, she has to land on the flower and crawl into the corolla and in this position she is vulnerable to attack by the male.

== Interspecies interaction ==
A. maculosum is a carder bee that competes with other carpenter bees, such as Xylocopa californica arizonensis for trap-nest sites. A. maculosum prevent carpenter bee nests from being established.

== Synonyms ==
Synonyms for this species include:

- Anthidium maculatum_homonym Smith, 1854
- Anthidium lupinellum Cockerell, 1904
- Anthidium americanum Friese, 1911
- Anthidium uyacanum Cockerell, 1949
