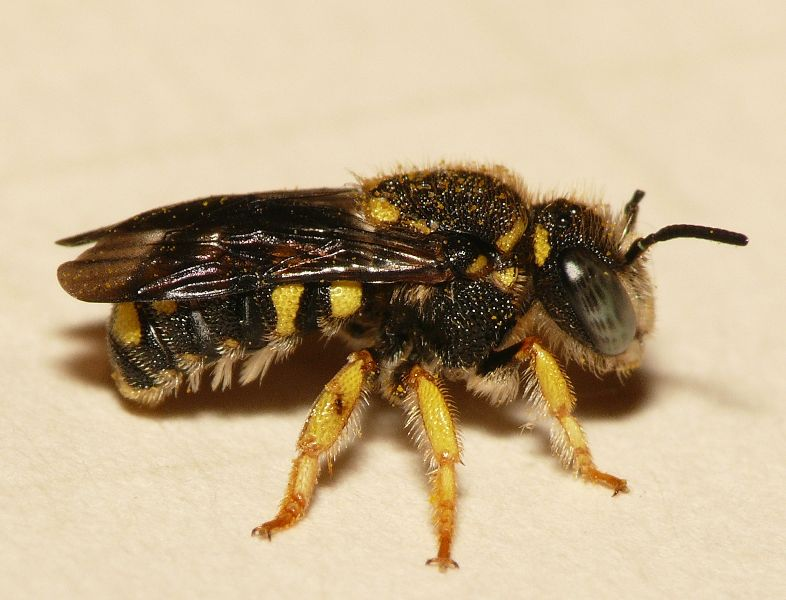
- Anthidiellum strigatum

Scientific classification
- Kingdom: Animalia
- Phylum: Arthropoda
- Class: Insecta
- Order: Hymenoptera
- Family: Megachilidae
- Subfamily: Megachilinae
- Tribe: Anthidiini
- Genus: Anthidiellum; Cockerell, 1904

= Anthidiellum =

Genus of bees

Anthidiellum is a genus of rotund resin bees in the family Megachilidae. There are more than 60 described species in Anthidiellum.

== Species ==
These 66 species belong to the genus Anthidiellum:

- Anthidiellum absonulum (Cockerell, 1932)
- Anthidiellum anale (Friese, 1914)
- Anthidiellum apicale (Cresson, 1878)
- Anthidiellum apicatum (Smith, 1879)
- Anthidiellum apicepilosum (Dover, 1929)
- Anthidiellum azteca (Urban, 2001)
- Anthidiellum bilobatum (Friese, 1917)
- Anthidiellum bimaculatum (Friese, 1914)
- Anthidiellum bipectinatum Pasteels, 1984
- Anthidiellum biroi (Friese, 1909)
- Anthidiellum bolivianum (Urban, 2001)
- Anthidiellum boreale Wu, 2004
- Anthidiellum breviusculum (Pérez, 1890)
- Anthidiellum bulawayense Mavromoustakis, 1937
- Anthidiellum butarsis Griswold, 2001
- Anthidiellum coloratulum (Pasteels, 1972)
- Anthidiellum coronum Wu, 2004
- Anthidiellum crassepunctatum (Popov, 1935)
- Anthidiellum crenulatum (Warncke, 1982)
- Anthidiellum cyreniacum (Gribodo, 1925)
- Anthidiellum ehrhorni (Cockerell, 1900)
- Anthidiellum eiseni (Cockerell, 1913)
- Anthidiellum eritrinum (Friese, 1915)
- Anthidiellum flavescens (Friese, 1925)
- Anthidiellum forsteni (Ritsema, 1874)
- Anthidiellum hondurasicum (Cockerell, 1949)
- Anthidiellum ignotum Engel, 2009
- Anthidiellum krombeini Griswold, 2001
- Anthidiellum latipes (Bingham, 1897)
- Anthidiellum ludiense Wu, 1992
- Anthidiellum madli Pauly, 2001
- Anthidiellum mediale Pasteels, 1984
- Anthidiellum melanaspis Cockerell, 1929
- Anthidiellum melanocephalum (Cockerell, 1920)
- Anthidiellum meliponiforme (Cockerell, 1919)
- Anthidiellum micheneri Pauly, 2001
- Anthidiellum nigriceps (Friese, 1914)
- Anthidiellum nigripes (Friese, 1904)
- Anthidiellum notatum (Latreille, 1809)
- Anthidiellum orichalciscopatum (Strand, 1912)
- Anthidiellum otavicum (Cockerell, 1936)
- Anthidiellum pamae Eardley, 2018
- Anthidiellum perplexum (Smith, 1854)
- Anthidiellum polyochrum Mavromoustakis, 1937
- Anthidiellum ramakrishnae (Cockerell, 1919)
- Anthidiellum rasorium (Smith, 1875)
- Anthidiellum rubellum (Friese, 1917)
- Anthidiellum ruficeps (Friese, 1914)
- Anthidiellum rufomaculatum (Cameron, 1902)
- Anthidiellum scutellatum Wu, 2004
- Anthidiellum smithii (Ritsema, 1874)
- Anthidiellum solomonis (Krombein, 1951)
- Anthidiellum somaliense Eardley, 2018
- Anthidiellum spilognathum (Cockerell, 1936)
- Anthidiellum spilotum (Cockerell, 1920)
- Anthidiellum sternale Pasteels, 1984
- Anthidiellum strigatum (Panzer, 1805)
- Anthidiellum tegwaniense (Cockerell, 1914)
- Anthidiellum toltecum (Cresson, 1878)
- Anthidiellum transversale Pasteels, 1984
- Anthidiellum turneri (Friese, 1909)
- Anthidiellum xilitlense (Urban, 2001)
- Anthidiellum yunnanense Wu, 1962
- Anthidiellum zebra (Friese, 1904)
