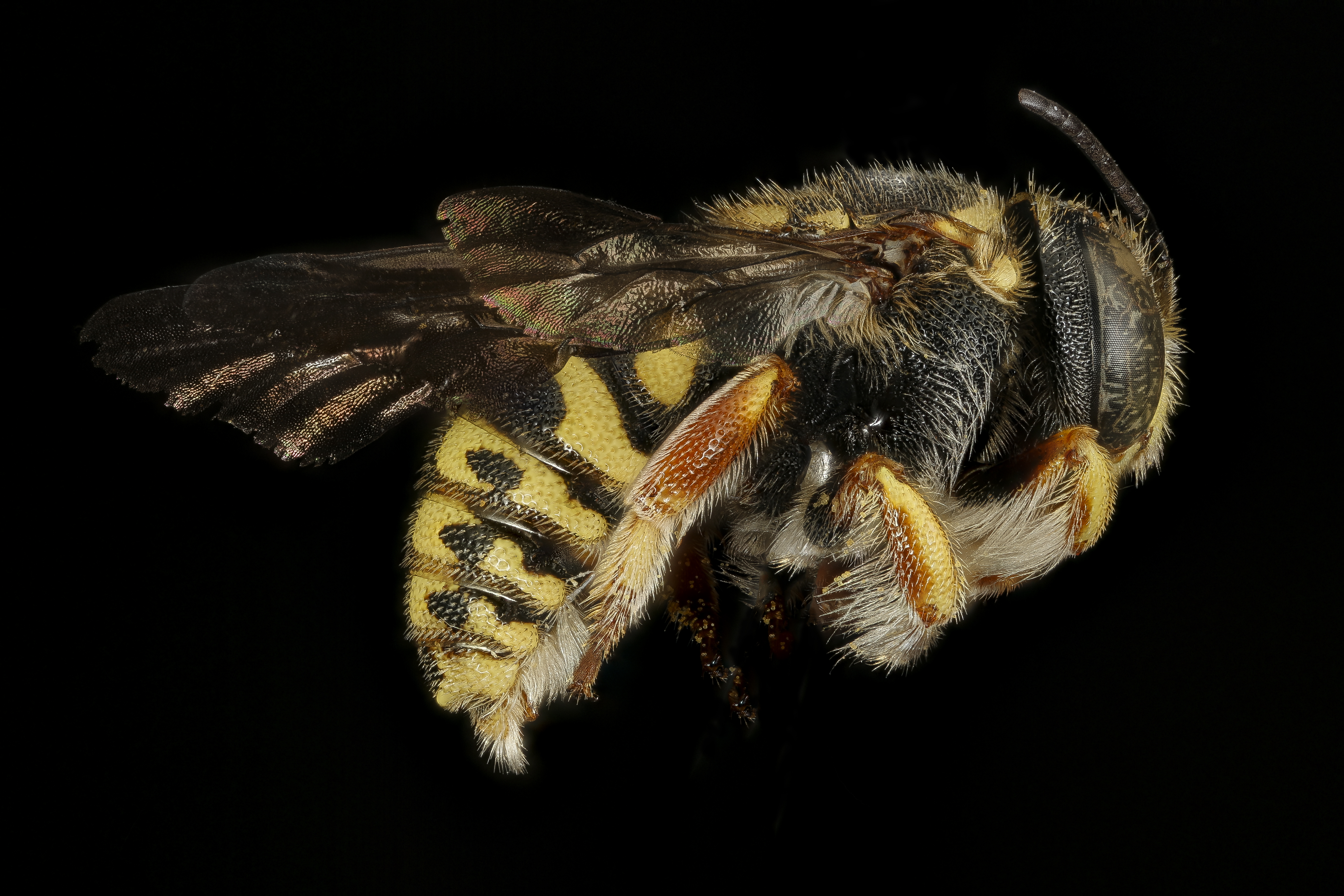
- Here is a series of male and female Anthidiellum ehrhorni

Scientific classification
- Kingdom: Animalia
- Phylum: Arthropoda
- Class: Insecta
- Order: Hymenoptera
- Family: Megachilidae
- Tribe: Anthidiini
- Genus: Anthidiellum
- Species: A. ehrhorni

Binomial name
- Anthidiellum ehrhorni (Cockerell, 1900)

= Anthidiellum ehrhorni =

Species of bee

Anthidiellum ehrhorni is a species of bee in the family Megachilidae. It is found in Central America and North America.

== Etymology ==
The specific epithet is a patronym in honor of Edward MacFarlane Ehrhorn.
