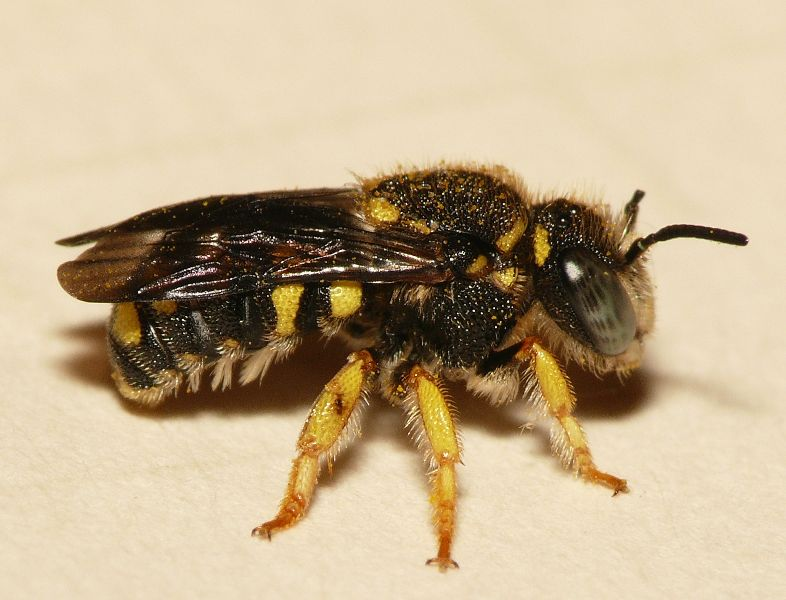
- Anthidiellum strigatum

Scientific classification
- Kingdom: Animalia
- Phylum: Arthropoda
- Clade: Pancrustacea
- Class: Insecta
- Order: Hymenoptera
- Family: Megachilidae
- Subfamily: Megachilinae
- Tribe: Anthidiini
- Genus: Anthidiellum
- Species: A. strigatum

Binomial name
- Anthidiellum strigatum (Panzer, 1805)

Synonyms
- Anthidiellum pauperculum Cockerell, 1928; Anthidiellum strigatum rhodium Tkalcu, 2006; Anthidium coronatum Dufour, 1853; Anthidium decoratum Chevrier, 1872; Anthidium minusculum Nylander, 1852; Anthidium quadristrigatum Germar, 1815; Anthidium scapulare Schenck, 1851; Anthidium strigatum (Panzer, 1804); Dianthidium leucorhinum Cockerell, 1924; Trachusa strigata Panzer, 1804

= Anthidiellum strigatum =

Species of bee

Anthidiellum strigatum is a species of rotund resin bee in the family Megachilidae. It is found in Africa, Europe, and Asia.

== Subspecies ==
These three subspecies belong to the species Anthidiellum strigatum:

- Anthidiellum strigatum contractum (Latreille, 1809)
- Anthidiellum strigatum luteum (Friese, 1897)
- Anthidiellum strigatum strigatum (Panzer, 1805)
