= Anthidiellum ramakrishnae =

Scientific classification
- Kingdom: Animalia
- Phylum: Arthropoda
- Class: Insecta
- Order: Hymenoptera
- Family: Megachilidae
- Genus: Anthidiellum
- Species: A. ramakrishnae

Binomial name
- Anthidiellum ramakrishnae (Cockerell, 1919)

Species of bee

Anthidiellum ramakrishnae is a species of leaf-cutting bee in the genus Anthidiellum, of the family Megachilidae.
