= Anthidiellum krombeini =

Scientific classification
- Domain: Eukaryota
- Kingdom: Animalia
- Phylum: Arthropoda
- Class: Insecta
- Order: Hymenoptera
- Family: Megachilidae
- Genus: Anthidiellum
- Species: A. krombeini

Binomial name
- Anthidiellum krombeini Griswold, 2001

Species of bee

Anthidiellum krombeini is a species of leaf-cutting bee in the genus Anthidiellum, of the family Megachilidae.
