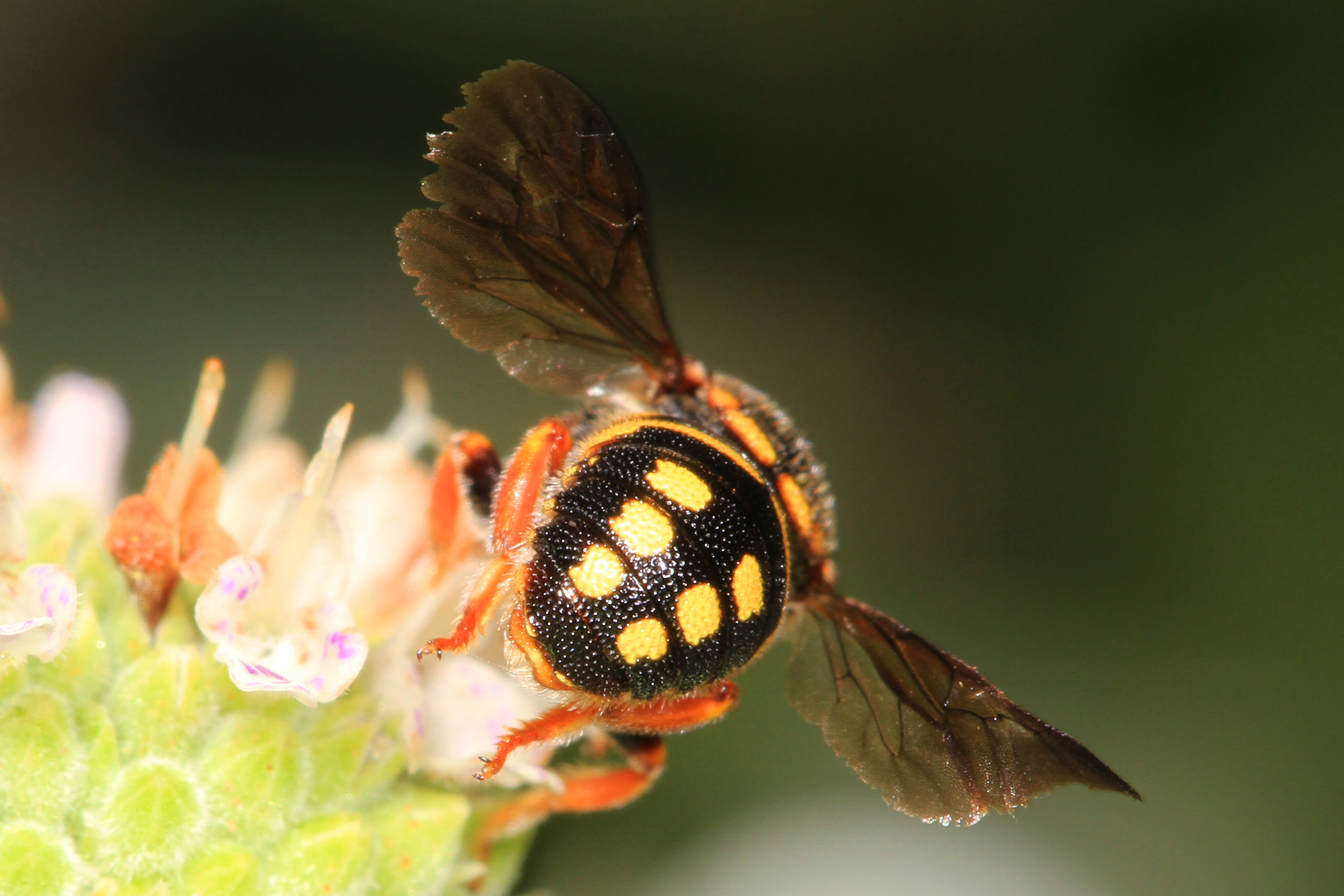

Scientific classification
- Kingdom: Animalia
- Phylum: Arthropoda
- Class: Insecta
- Order: Hymenoptera
- Family: Megachilidae
- Genus: Anthidiellum
- Species: A. notatum

Binomial name
- Anthidiellum notatum (Latreille, 1809)

= Anthidiellum notatum =

Species of bee

Anthidiellum notatum, the northern rotund resin bee, is a species of bee in the family Megachilidae. It is found in North America.

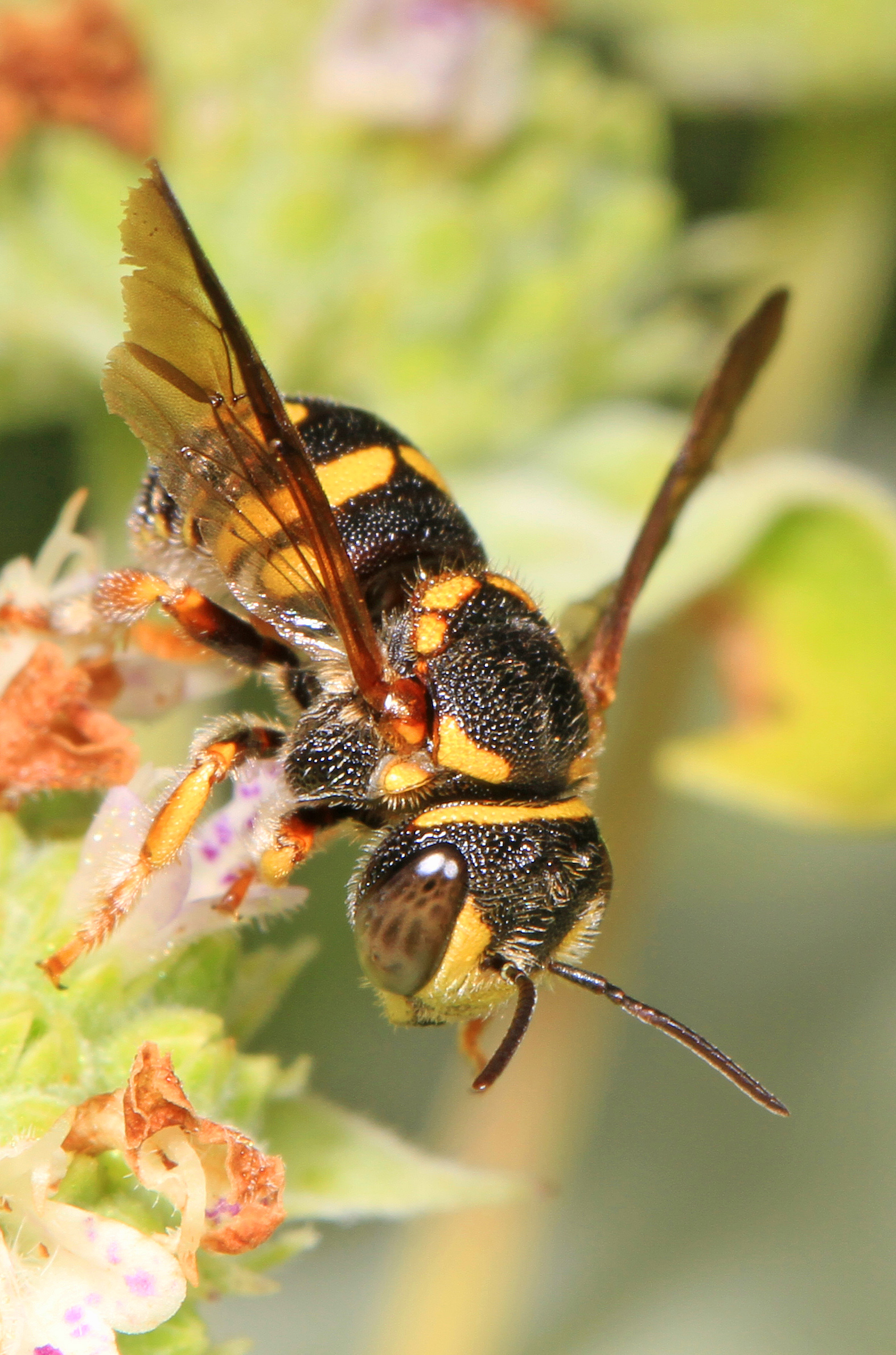
Northern rotund-resin bee, Anthidiellum notatum

== Subspecies ==
These five subspecies belong to the species Anthidiellum notatum:

- Anthidiellum notatum boreale (Robertson, 1902)
- Anthidiellum notatum gilense (Cockerell, 1897)
- Anthidiellum notatum notatum (Latreille, 1809)
- Anthidiellum notatum robertsoni (Cockerell, 1904)
- Anthidiellum notatum rufimaculatum Schwarz, 1926
