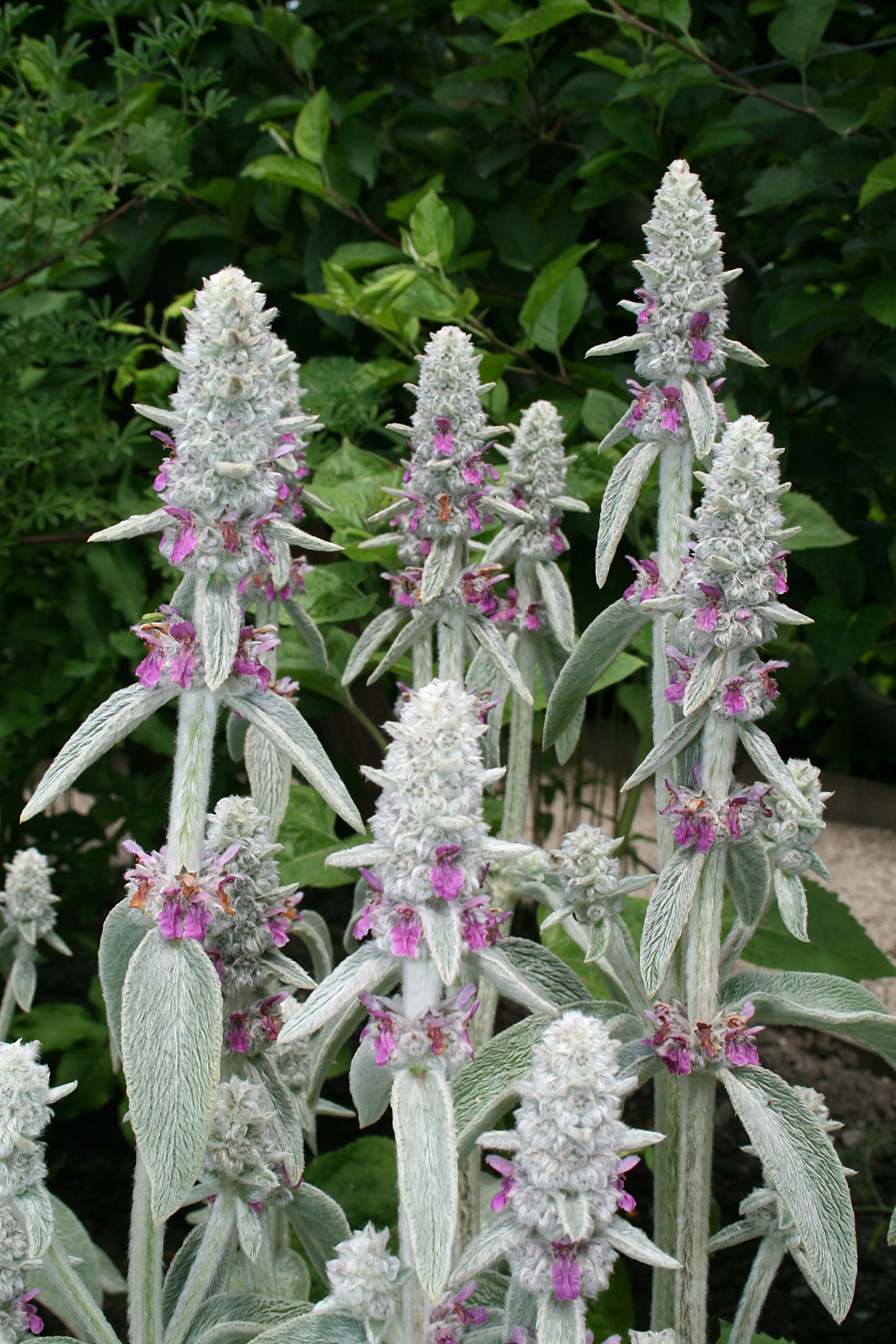

Scientific classification
- Kingdom: Plantae
- Clade: Embryophytes
- Clade: Tracheophytes
- Clade: Spermatophytes
- Clade: Angiosperms
- Clade: Eudicots
- Clade: Asterids
- Order: Lamiales
- Family: Lamiaceae
- Genus: Stachys
- Species: S. byzantina

Binomial name
- Stachys byzantina K.Koch

Synonyms
- Eriostomum lanatum Hoffmanns. & Link; Stachys germanica subsp. lanata Douin; Stachys lanata Jacq.; Stachys lanata var. parvifolia K.Koch; Stachys olympica Poir.; Stachys taurica Zefir.

= Stachys byzantina =

Species of flowering plant

Stachys byzantina (syn. S. lanata), the lamb's-ear (lamb's ear) Monty plant or woolly hedgenettle, is a species of flowering plant in the mint family Lamiaceae, native to Armenia, Iran, and Turkey. It is cultivated throughout much of the temperate world as an ornamental plant, and is naturalised in some locations as an escapee from gardens. Plants are very often found under the synonym Stachys lanata or Stachys olympica.

Lamb's-ear flowers in late spring and early summer; plants produce tall spike-like stems with a few reduced leaves. The flowers are small and light purple. The plants tend to be evergreen but can "die back” during cold winters and regenerate new growth from the crowns.

== Description ==
Lamb's-ears are herbaceous perennials, usually densely covered with gray or silver-white, silky-lanate hairs. They are named lamb's ears because of the leaves' curved shape and white, soft, fur-like hair coating. Flowering stems are erect, often branched, and tend to be 4-angled, growing 40–80 cm tall. The leaves are thick and somewhat wrinkled, densely covered on both sides with gray-silver colored, silky-lanate hairs; the undersides are more silver-white in color than the top surfaces. The leaves are arranged oppositely on the stems and 5 to 10 cm long. The leaf petioles are semiamplexicaul (the bases wrapping halfway around the stem) with the basal leaves having blades oblong-elliptic in shape, measuring 10 cm long and 2.5 cm wide (though variation exists in cultivated forms). The leaf margins are crenulate but covered with dense hairs, the leaf apexes attenuate, gradually narrowing to a rounded point.

=== Flowers ===
The flowering spikes are 10–22 cm long, producing verticillasters that each have many flowers and are crowded together over most of the length on the spike-like stem. The leaves produced on the flowering stems are greatly reduced in size and subsessile, the lower ones slightly longer than the interscholastic and the upper ones shorter than the verticillasters. The leaf bracteoles are linear to linear-lanceolate in shape and 6 mm long.

The flowers have no pedicels (sessile) and the calyx is tubular-campanulate in shape, being slightly curved and 1.2 cm long. The calyx is glabrous except for the inside surface of the teeth, having 10 veins with the accessory veins inconspicuous. The 2–3 mm long calyx teeth are ovate-triangular in shape and are subequal or the posterior teeth larger, with rigid apices. The corollas have some darker purple tinted veins inside; they are 1.2 cm long with silky-lanate hairs but bases that are glabrous. The corolla tubes are about 6 mm long with the upper lip ovate in shape with entire margins; the lower lips are subpatent with the middle lobe broadly ovate in shape, lateral lobes oblong. The stamen filaments are densely villous from the base to the middle. The styles are exserted much past the corolla. There are immature nutlets without hairs, brown in color and oblong in shape.

== Cultivation ==
Lamb's-ear is a commonly grown plant for children's gardens, as it is easy to grow and the thick felt-like leaves are fun to touch. It is also used as an edging plant. In Brazil it is used as an edible herb, called peixinho-da-horta prepared battered and deep-fried sprinkled with lemon juice and said to taste fish-like. It has sometimes been used as a medicinal plant.

A number of cultivars exist including white flowering forms, plants with shorter habit and plants that do not bloom as much:

- 'Big Ears' - leaves very large, up to 1 foot (30 cm) long.
- 'Cotton Boll' - a sterile cultivar that does not produce flowering stems. Asexually propagated.
- 'Primrose Heron' - leaves yellow in spring; flowers pink
- 'Sheila Macqueen' - sterile; low-growing; leaves large.
- 'Silky Fleece' - grows 25 cm tall with lilac-plum flowers, produce smaller white-woolly foliage. Seed propagated.
- 'Silver Carpet' - sterile; leaves grey. Asexually propagated.
- 'Striped Phantom' - leaves variegated.

Lamb's-ear is quite popular for a multitude of insects and hummingbirds but in particular bees. One special type of bee known as the wool carder bee collects the fuzz from the leaves to use for making nests in decayed wood. It has also been documented that bumble bees congregate in morning hours to collect the water condensation that has accumulated on the leaves.

== Uses ==
Stachys byzantina extract has shown antimicrobial activity against Staphylococcus aureus that is resistant to vancomycin.

In Brazil, it is sometimes eaten after being breaded and fried, having a taste reportedly similar to fish meat.

Due to its relatively high rate of evapotranspiration, Stachys byzantina is a potentially useful species for rainwater retention and therefore flood prevention.

== Chemical components ==
Essential oil extracted from leaves of Stachys byzantina has light yellow colour and yields 0.25 %. Hydrodistilled essential oil are rich in 1.8-cineole (14.8 %), linalool (12.9 %), cubenol (9.9 %), germacrene-D (9.6 %), α-terpineol (7.8 %), menthone (6.9 %) and (Z)-lanceol acetate (6.2 %).

== Gallery ==
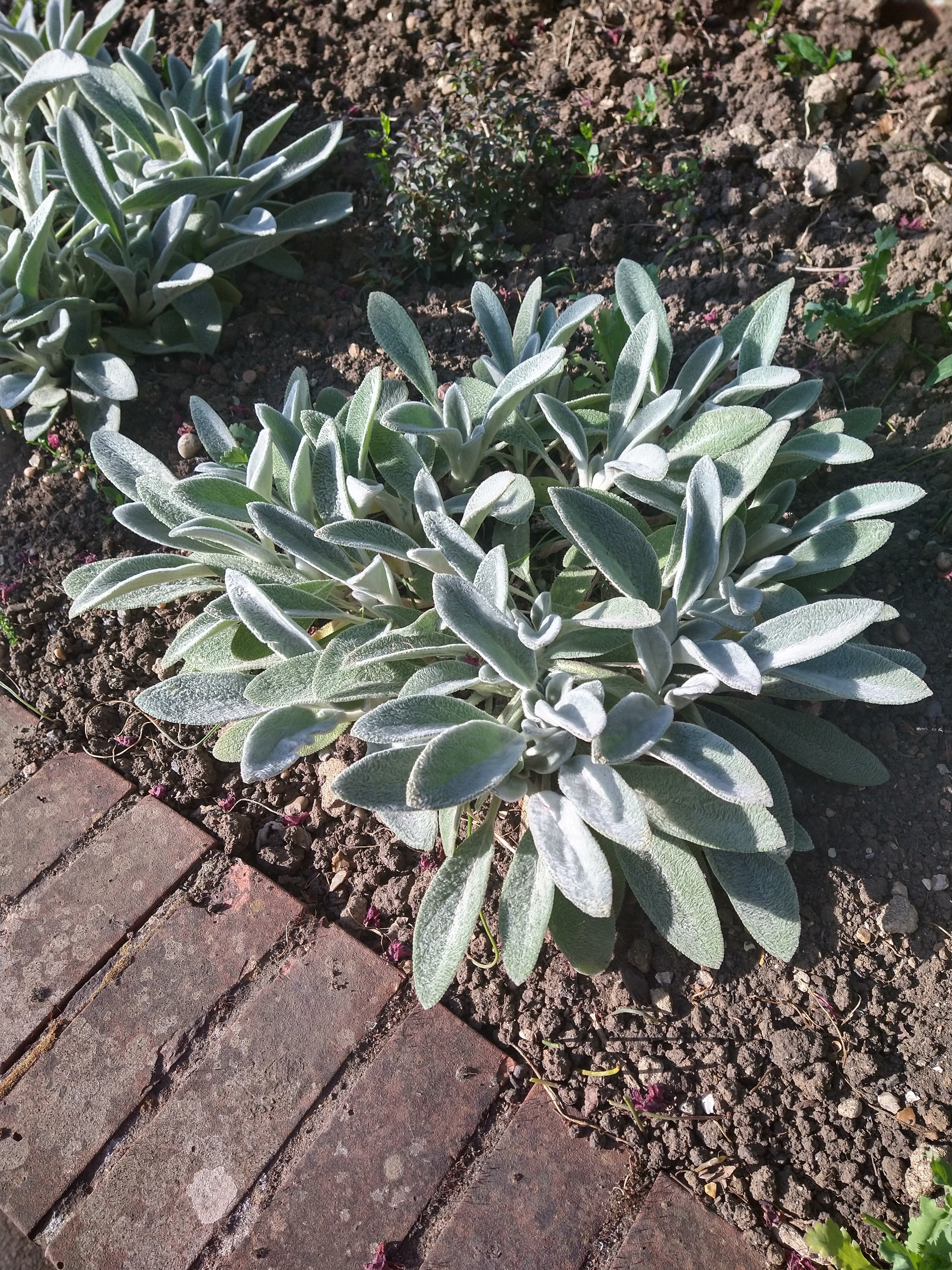
Foliage

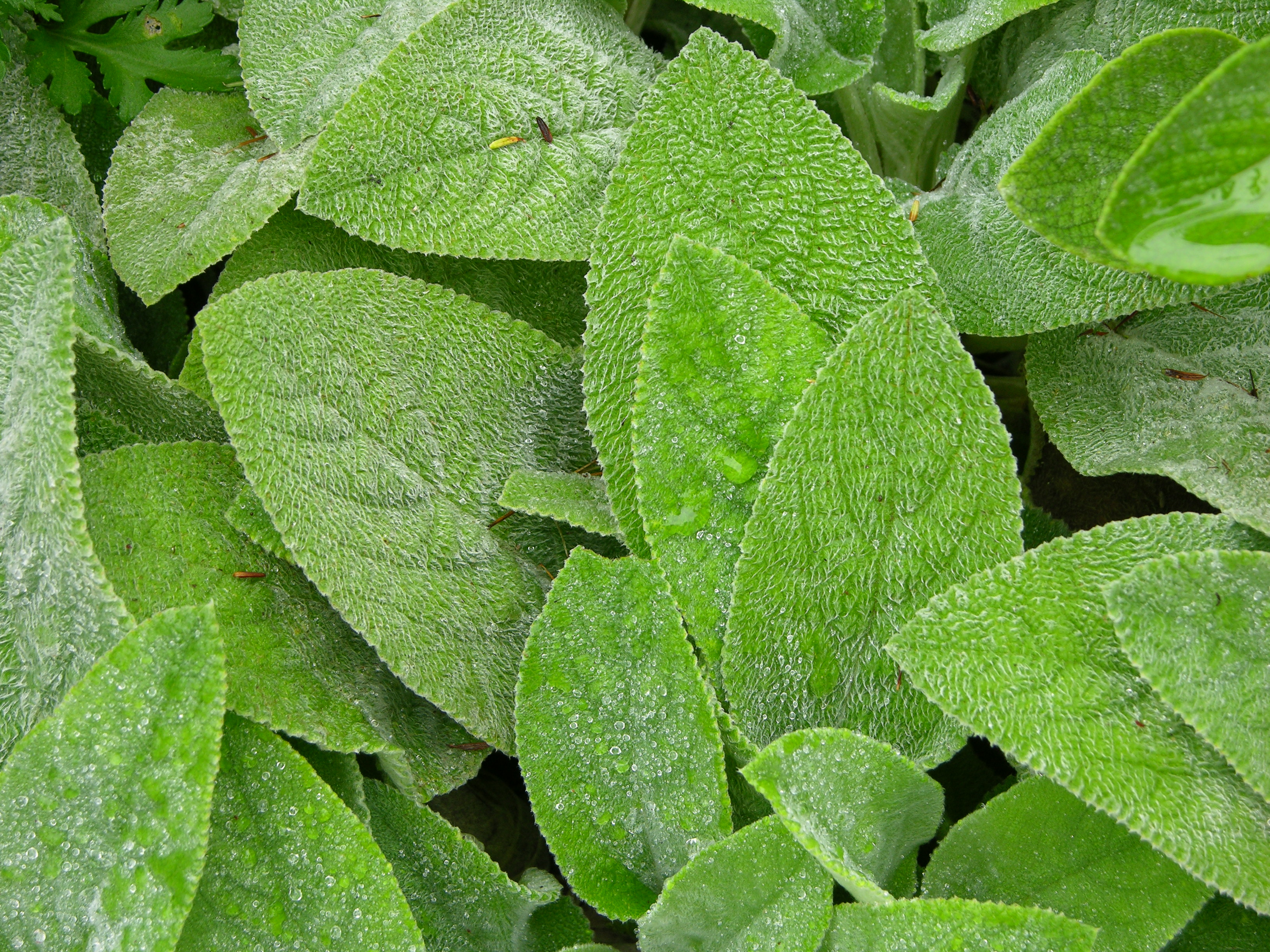
Young green leaves

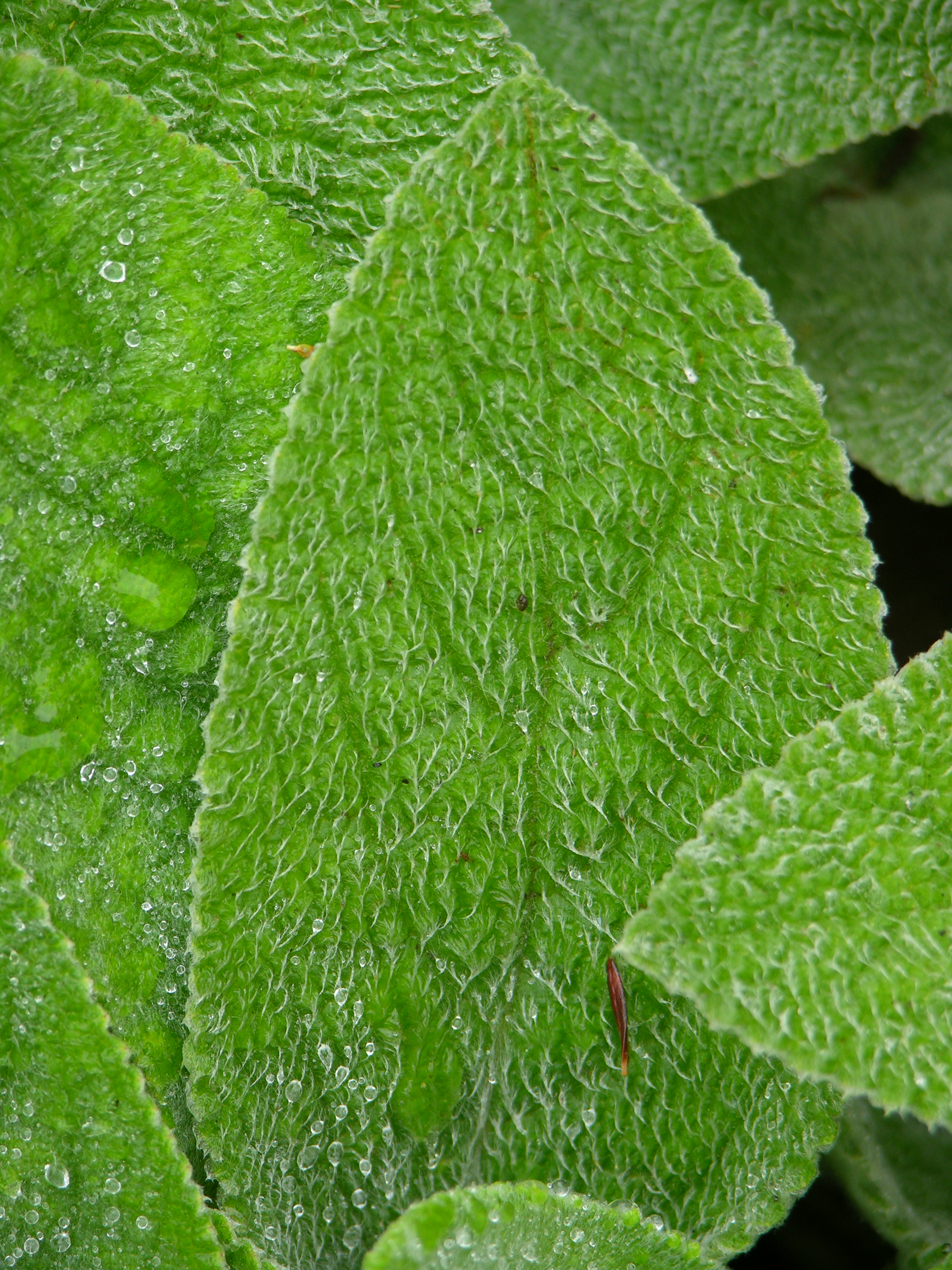
Closeup of a young green fuzzy leaf

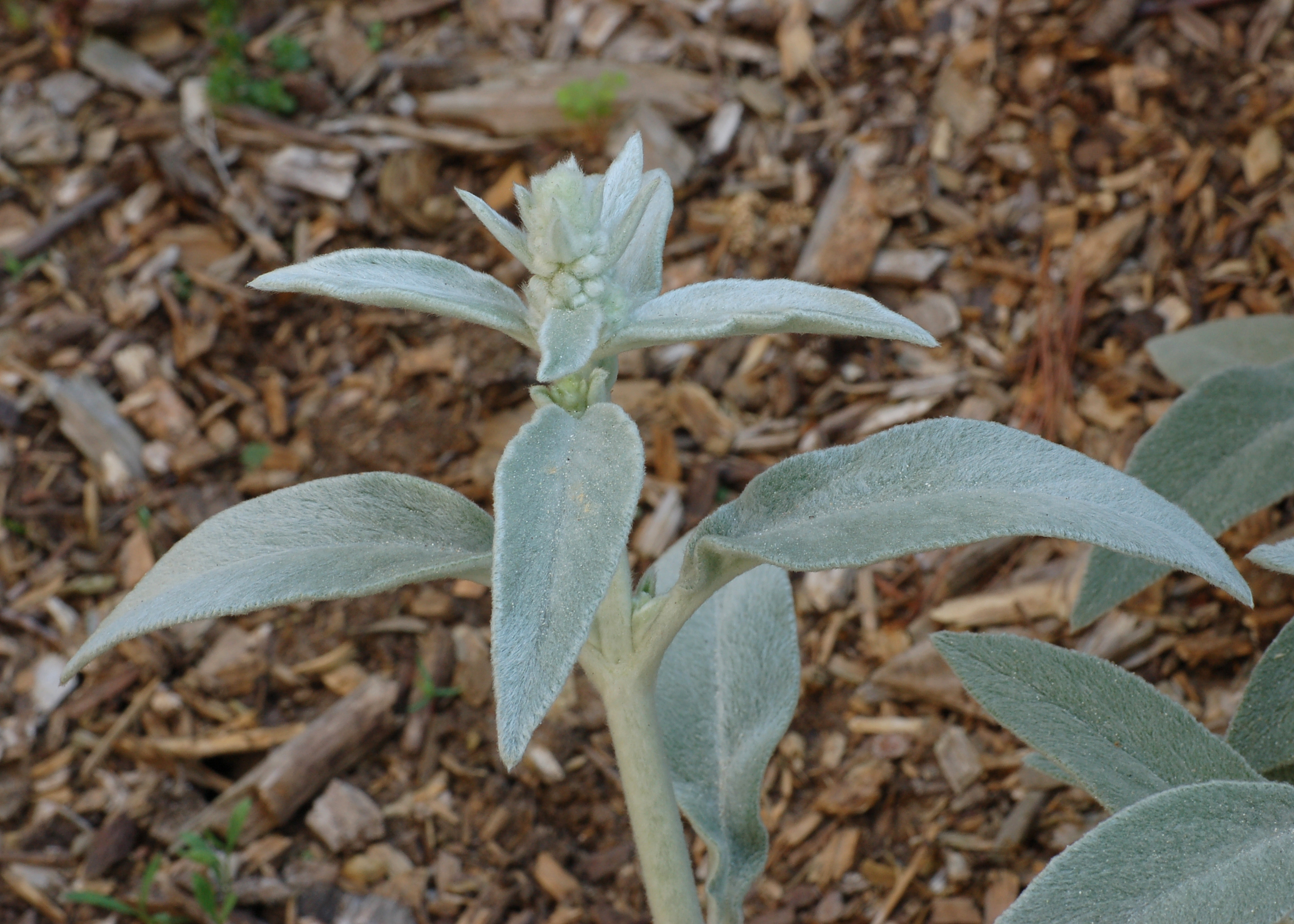

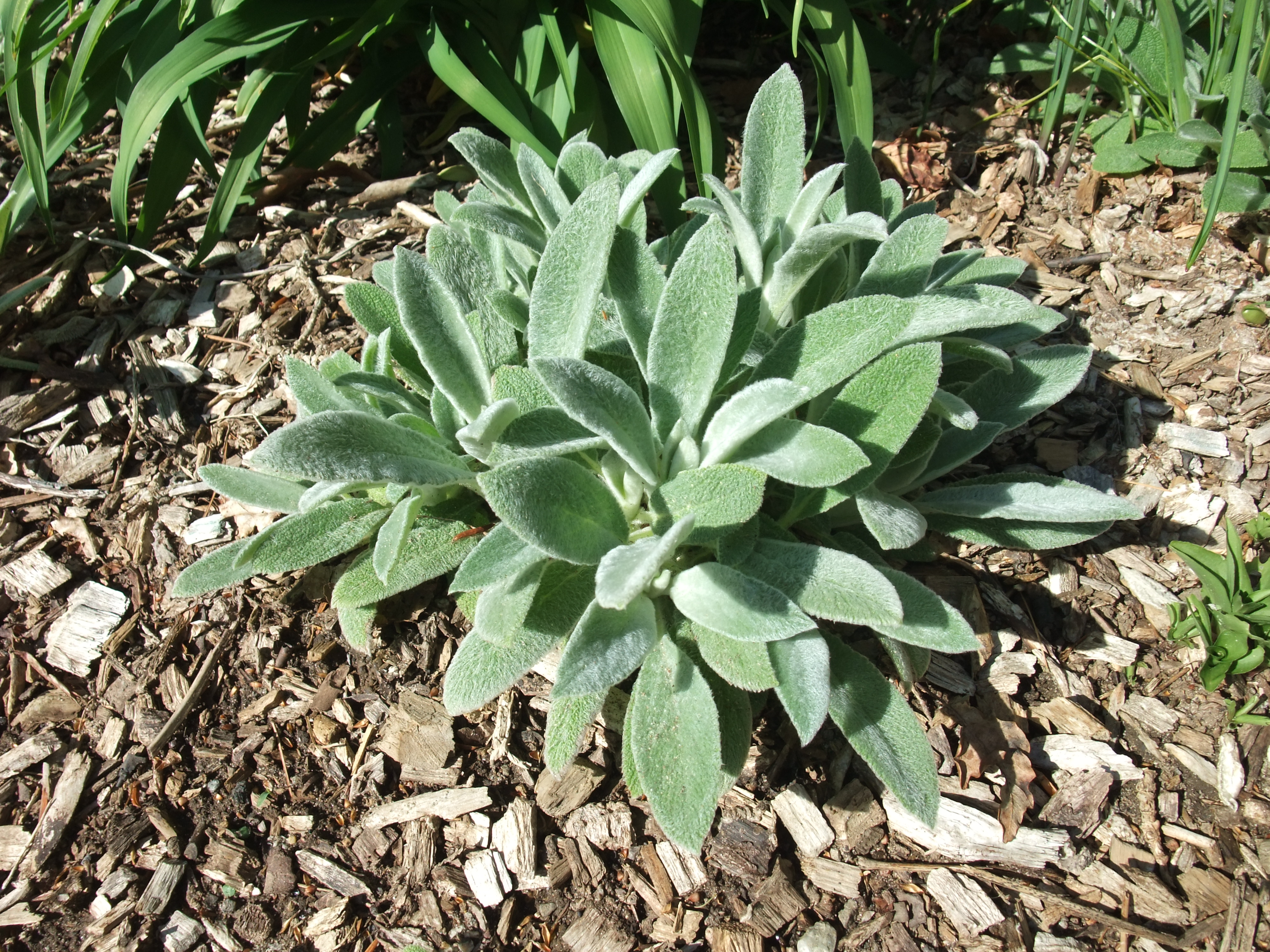

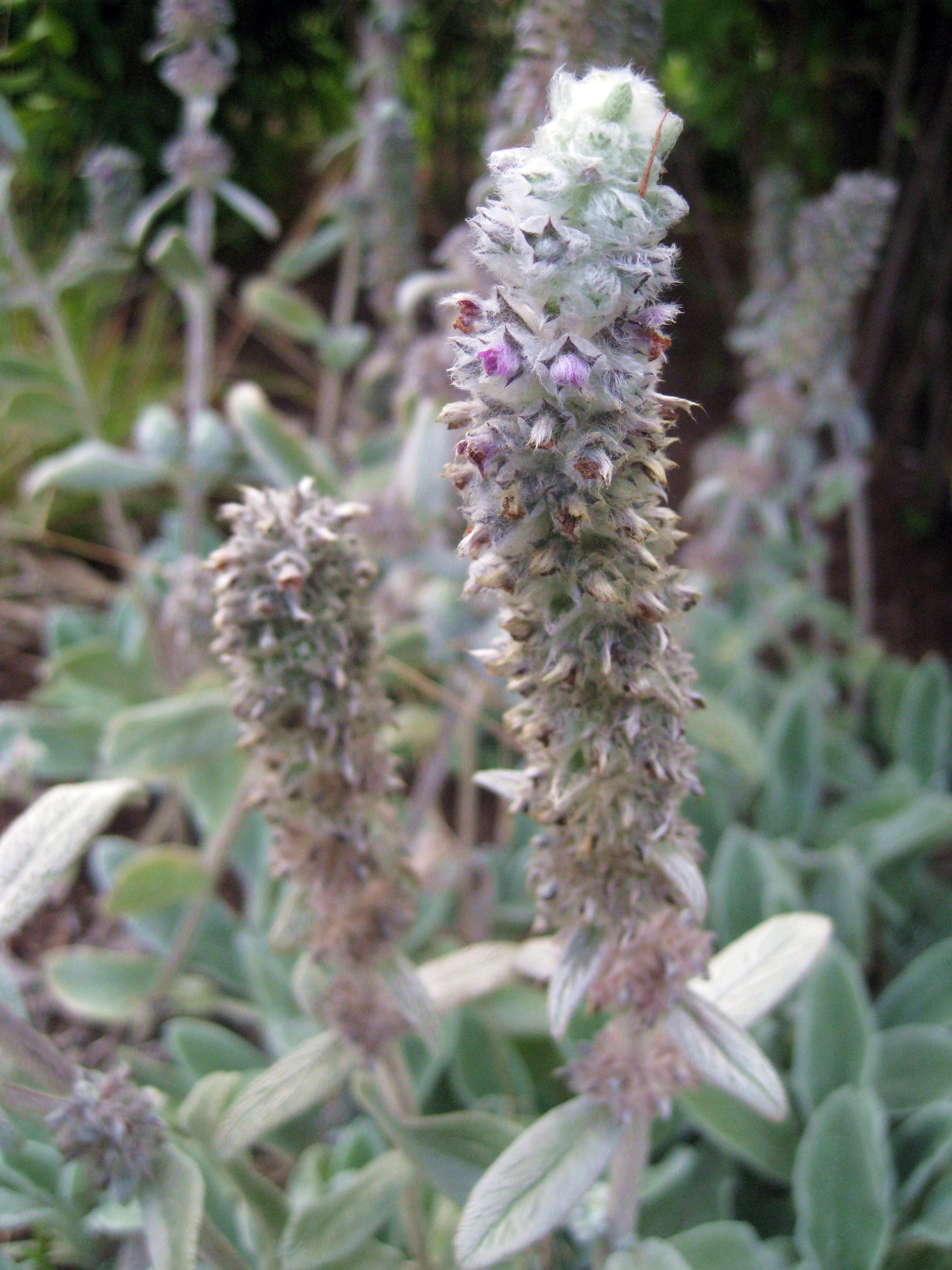

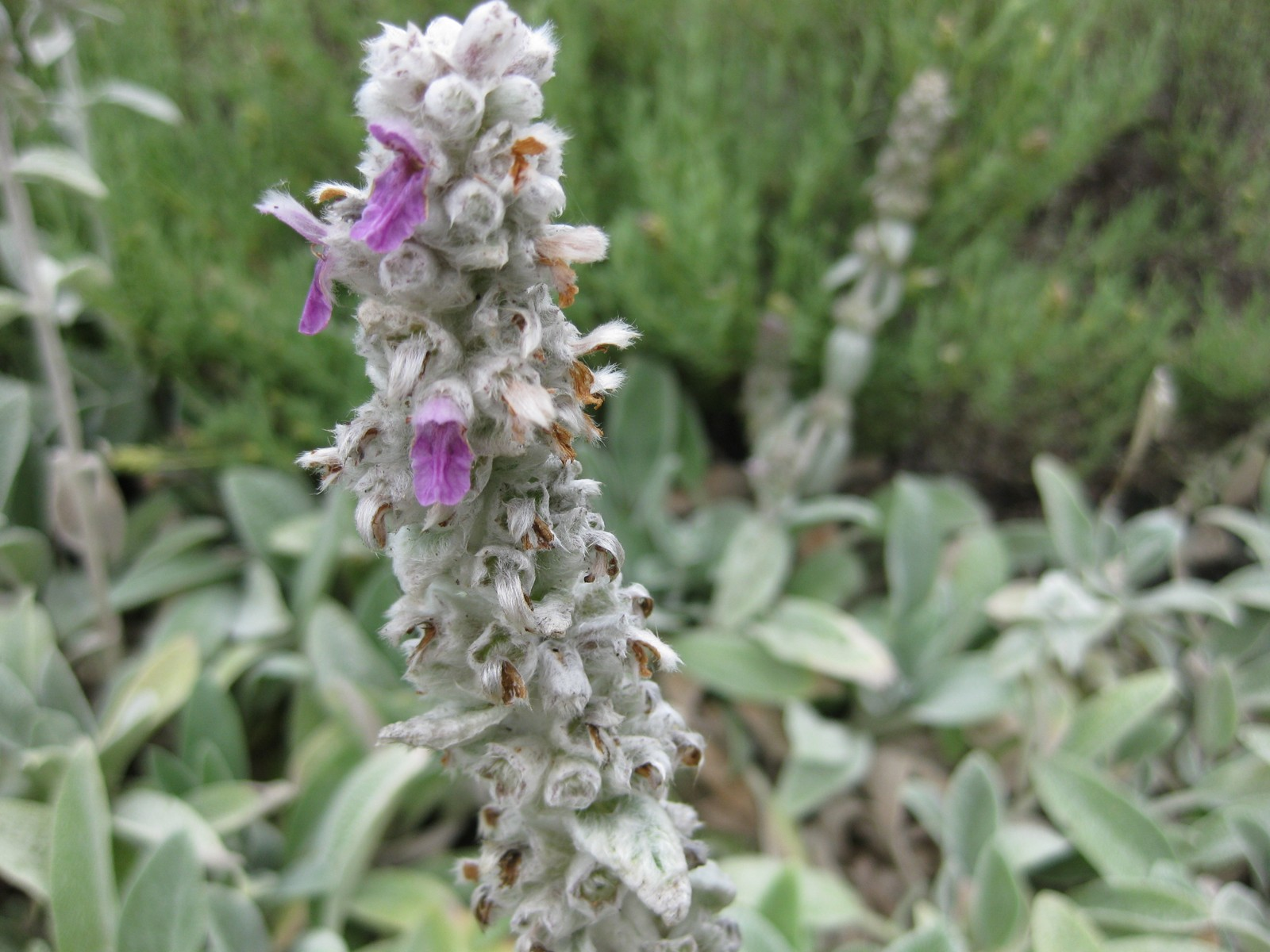
Flower closeup
