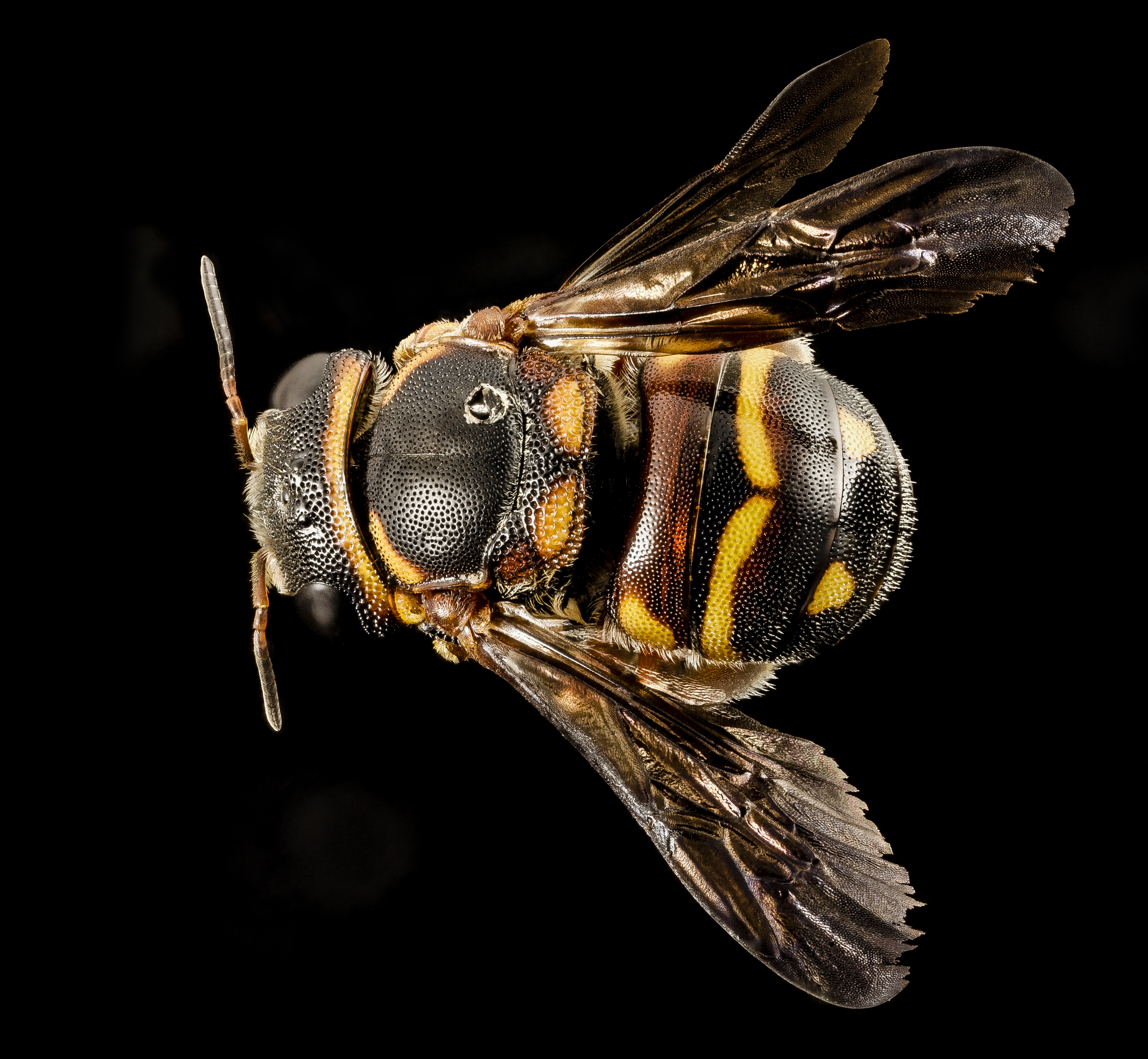

Scientific classification
- Domain: Eukaryota
- Kingdom: Animalia
- Phylum: Arthropoda
- Class: Insecta
- Order: Hymenoptera
- Family: Megachilidae
- Tribe: Anthidiini
- Genus: Anthidiellum
- Species: A. perplexum

Binomial name
- Anthidiellum perplexum (Smith, 1854)

= Anthidiellum perplexum =

Species of bee

Anthidiellum perplexum is a species of bee in the family Megachilidae.

== Etymology ==
The specific epithet perplexum means "perplexing" in Latin."
