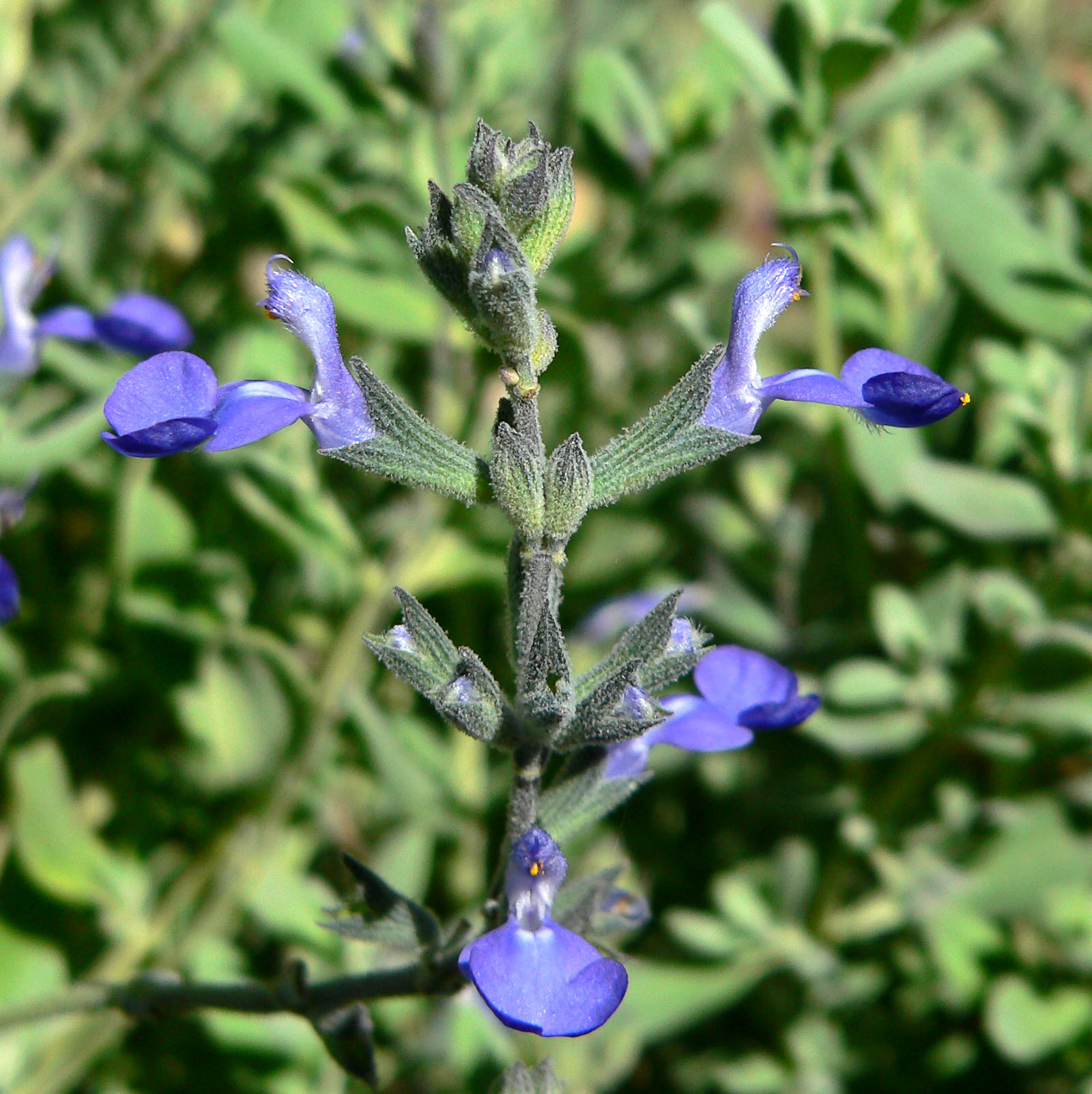

Scientific classification
- Kingdom: Plantae
- Clade: Tracheophytes
- Clade: Angiosperms
- Clade: Eudicots
- Clade: Asterids
- Order: Lamiales
- Family: Lamiaceae
- Genus: Salvia
- Species: S. chamaedryoides

Binomial name
- Salvia chamaedryoides Cav.

= Salvia chamaedryoides =

Species of flowering plant

Salvia chamaedryoides, or germander sage, is an evergreen perennial native to the high desert (2100–2800 m elevation) of the Sierra Madre Oriental range in Mexico. Its name comes from sharing the running rootstock typical of Teucrium chamaedrys (wall germander). Spreading freely, it reaches a height of 60 cm (24 in) when in bloom, with small grey evergreen foliage. The flowers are blue, appearing sporadically throughout the growing season, with peaks of bloom in early summer and autumn. It has been grown in European horticulture since the early 19th century, but was only introduced to the U.S. in the 1980s.
