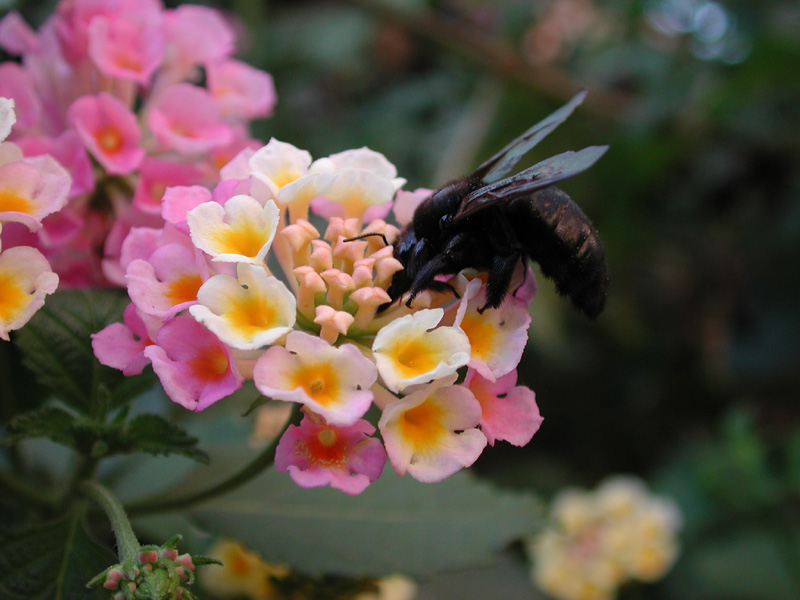
- Female

Scientific classification
- Kingdom: Animalia
- Phylum: Arthropoda
- Clade: Pancrustacea
- Class: Insecta
- Order: Hymenoptera
- Family: Apidae
- Genus: Xylocopa
- Species: X. californica

Binomial name
- Xylocopa californica Cresson, 1864

= California carpenter bee =

Species of bee

The California carpenter bee or Western carpenter bee, Xylocopa californica, is a species of carpenter bee in the order Hymenoptera, and it is native to western North America.

== Distribution ==
There are approximately 400 species worldwide of the genus Xylocopa. X. californica is typically found in California, Nevada, Oregon, Washington, Utah, Arizona, New Mexico, Texas, and Northwestern Mexico. It is especially abundant, along with X. sonorina, in the Central Valley and in Southern California, including the Mojave Desert. They are agriculturally beneficial insects and pollinators of diverse California chaparral and woodlands and desert native plant species. This carpenter bee is active during hot seasons. Therefore, they are considered an endothermic insect as it absorbs heat in the desert conditions. As the bee absorbs too much heat in its body, it has to limit the time it flies and fly in the time of day in which it is cooler.

== Description ==
Their head is larger and thicker than their thorax; however, the size of the head differs between females and males. Female carpenter bees have bigger heads than males with more narrow heads. The California carpenter bee is all black, with bluish/greenish reflections. The males typically have at least a few light hairs on the pronotum (dorsal prothorax) and the abdominal segments. California carpenter bees have hair on their heads; most of their hair lays in the lower part of their head and cheeks compared to the sparse hairs on the top of the head. They have dark wings without stigma and are 13–30 mm long overall.

== Foraging behavior ==
Xylocopa californica feeds on both nectar and pollen and, because of its large body size, generally visits larger, open flowers. Its foraging behavior consists of three principal forms of movement: rapid forward flight, hovering, and perching or walking across flower blossoms. Although its nectar sources are relatively varied, its pollen sources appear to be more specialized, with a preference for creosote bush (Larrea tridentata) and mesquite (Prosopis glandulosa). The species may also engage in nectar robbing by chewing a hole in the side of a flower and extracting nectar without pollinating it during that particular visit. In Big Bend National Park, Texas, X. californica has been observed robbing nectar from ocotillo (Fouquieria splendens), while also serving as the plant’s primary pollinator within the park.

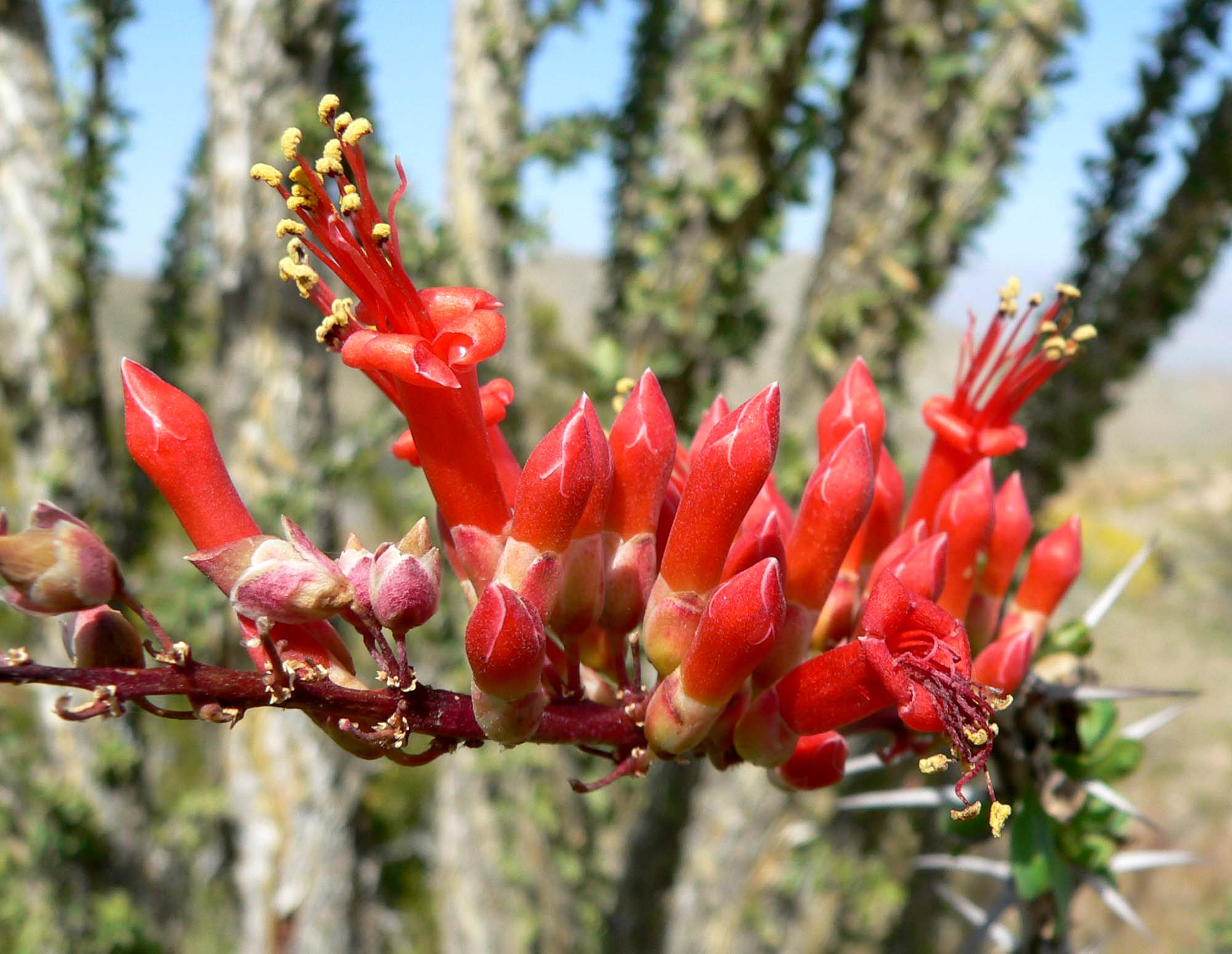
Fouquieria splendens

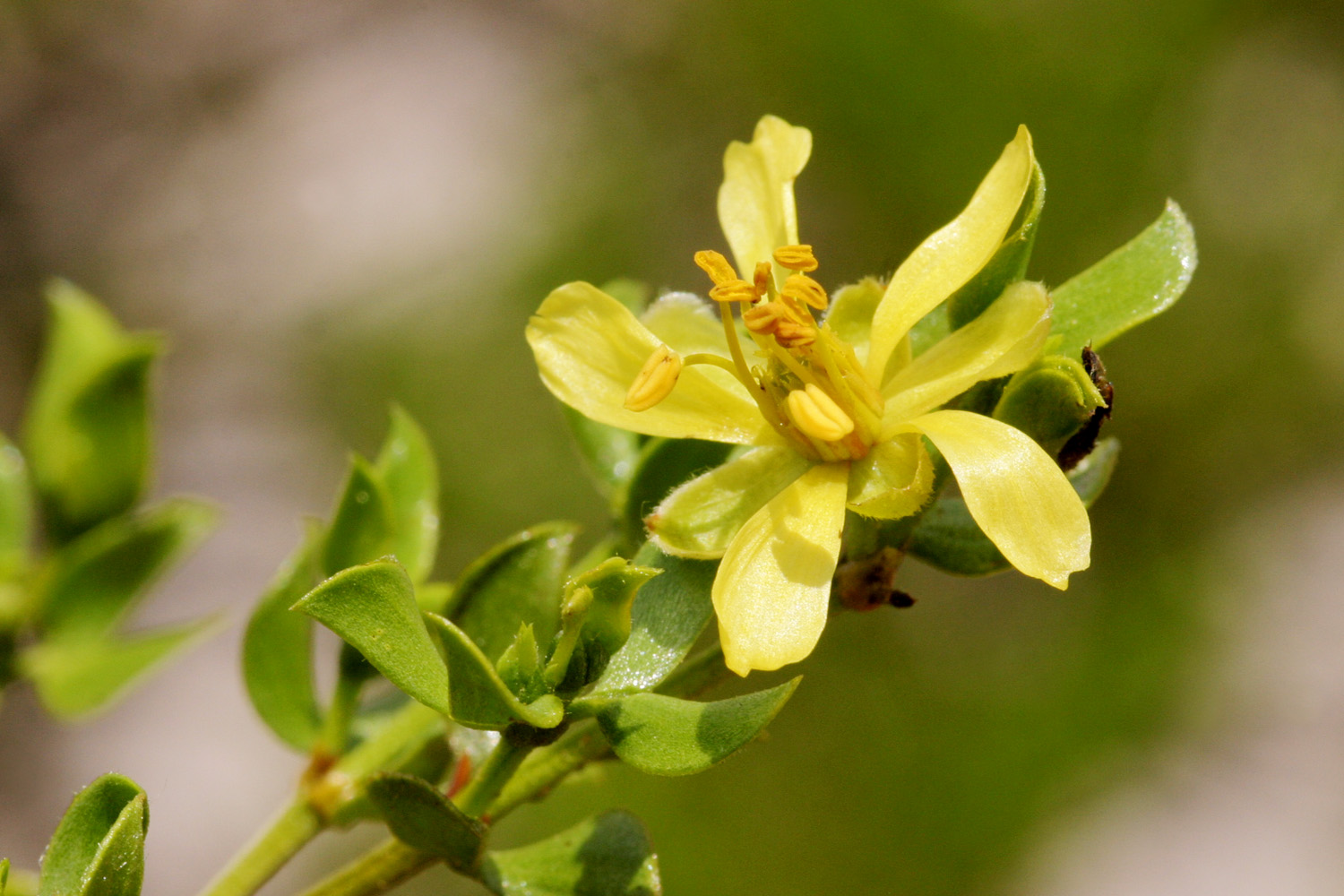
Larrea tridentata

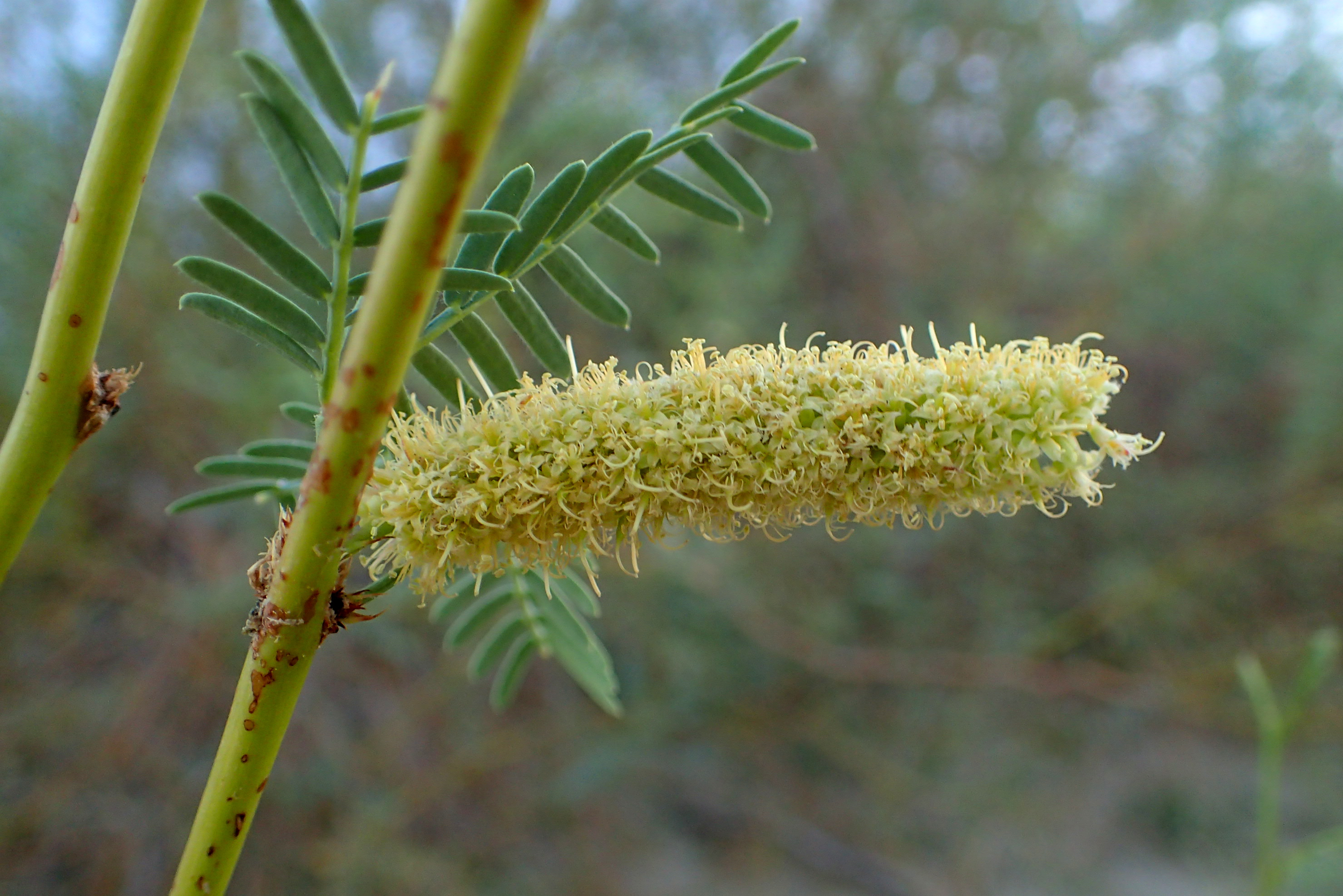
Prosopis glandulosa

=== Floral sonication ===
Floral sonication is essential for the foraging of many Hymenoptera. X. californica performs floral sonication to obtain pollen. They do this by gripping the poricidal anthers with their mandibles and contracting their flight muscles, rapidly vibrating their body and the flower's anthers, releasing the pollen onto the abdomen and legs of the bees. This process allows for pollination to happen.

The vibration frequency is different throughout their body; their head's natural vibration is 87 Hz, and their abdominal terga is 163 Hz.X. californica can adjust its frequency to different types of flowers.

=== Temperature regulation ===
Xylocopa californica inhabit the deserts of southwestern North America and endure high temperatures while they forage. Foraging in these high temperatures may cause thermoregulatory problems for the bee, which is increased by the heat released from the muscular activity needed for their flight. Unlike other insects, they can fly in temperatures as high as 48°C, which would be deadly for others, but can fly for a short period of time. On the other hand, they can not withstand temperatures lower than 10-15 °C.

== Reproduction ==
=== Mating behavior ===
Xylocopa californica has many types of mating behaviors. These include hovering near sites and chasing away other males, exhibiting female-defense polygyny. Multiple males may try to grasp the female when she returns to the nest, then a struggle between the males may happen to be able to grasp the female midair to copulate; in particular, they look for virgin females because females only mate once in their lifetime. After a few seconds, they separate, and the male returns to its hovering area. Other males may patrol more than one nest and shuttle throughout many sites in a day. If they are not patrolling the nests, then they may exhibit scramble competition at flowering sites, where they hope to catch a female. The males are territorial, but they do not have a stinger.

=== Nesting ===
Xylocopa californica carve their nest in wood. They dig into the wood using their sharp mandibles while they vibrate their body- they do not eat the wood. They dig a tunnel in substrates such as live or dead wood and hollow stems of Yucca and Agave plants, then dig to the right and left, creating a T-shape nest.

Their nest's success depends on the available pollen and nectar found in the area. A suitable nest substrate is needed for their reproduction and survival; the quantity of stalks in the area is important in determining their total nest density.

== Predators ==
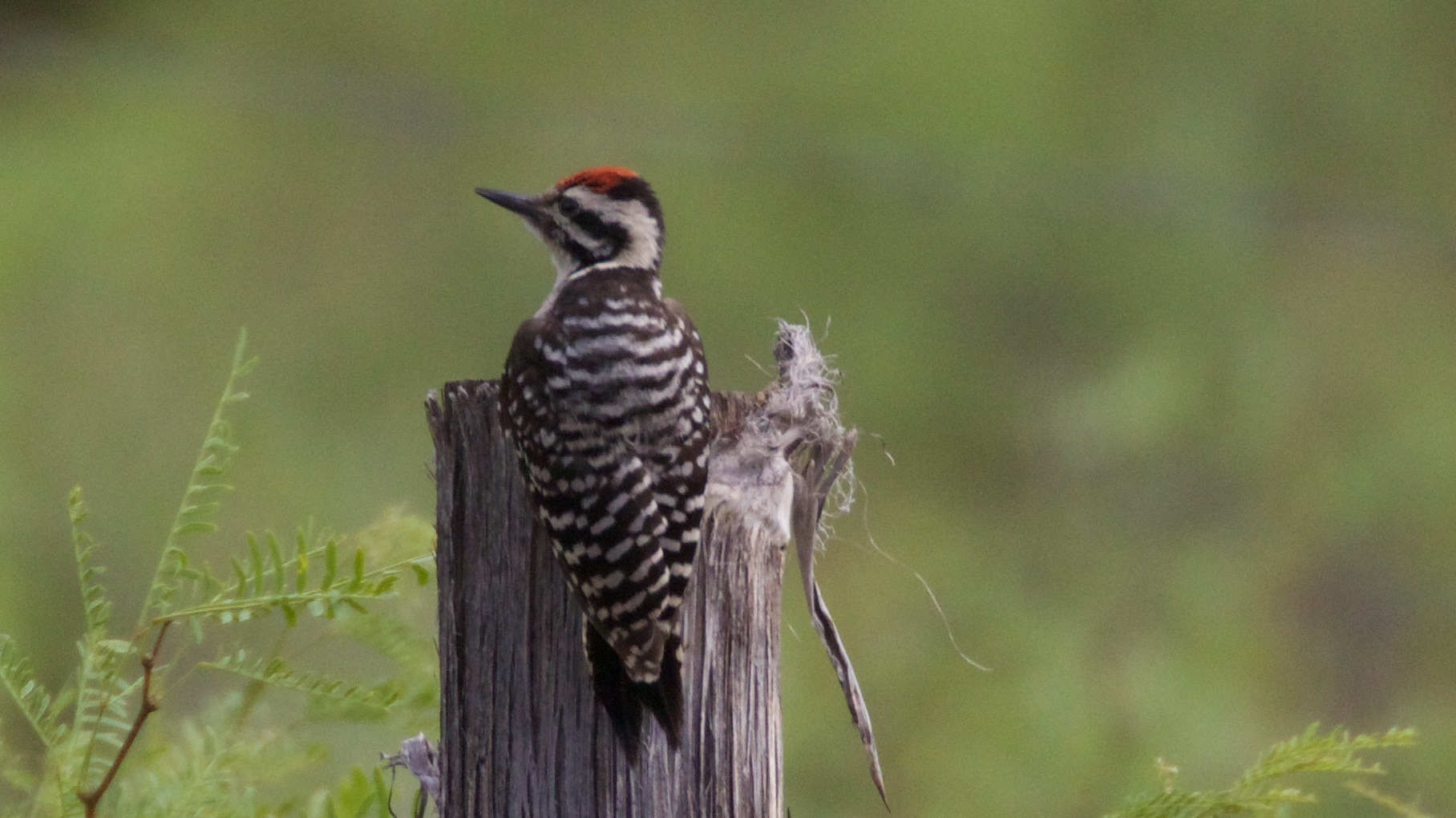
Ladder-backed woodpecker

Xylocopa californica does not have many predators, but in the southwest of Northern America, the ladder-backed woodpecker, Dendrocopos scalaria, has been observed to attack their nests. And the bee fly, Anthrax simson, is a parasite of their nests

There are reports of the honey bee, Apis mellifera, having negative effects on X. californica populations. The carpenter bees are attracted to the floral scents of the honey produced by the honey bees; X. californica may come near or inside their hives and get attacked by the hive resulting in the death of the carpenter bee.

== Disease ==
The fungus Ascosphaera apis is generally found in the larva of the European honey bee, Apis mellifera, causing the larva to be mummified. It has also been found in X. californica, except the infected larva does not look the same as the honey bee's; they develop spore cysts beneath the larval integument. X. californica are not the natural hosts of this fungus, but they may be infected if they visit the same plants as other infected honey bees.

== Subspecies ==
The species has three named subspecies, defined solely by coloration and geography:

- Xylocopa californica arizonensis Cresson, 1879
- Xylocopa californica californica Cresson, 1864
- Xylocopa californica diamesa Hurd, 1954

== Gallery ==
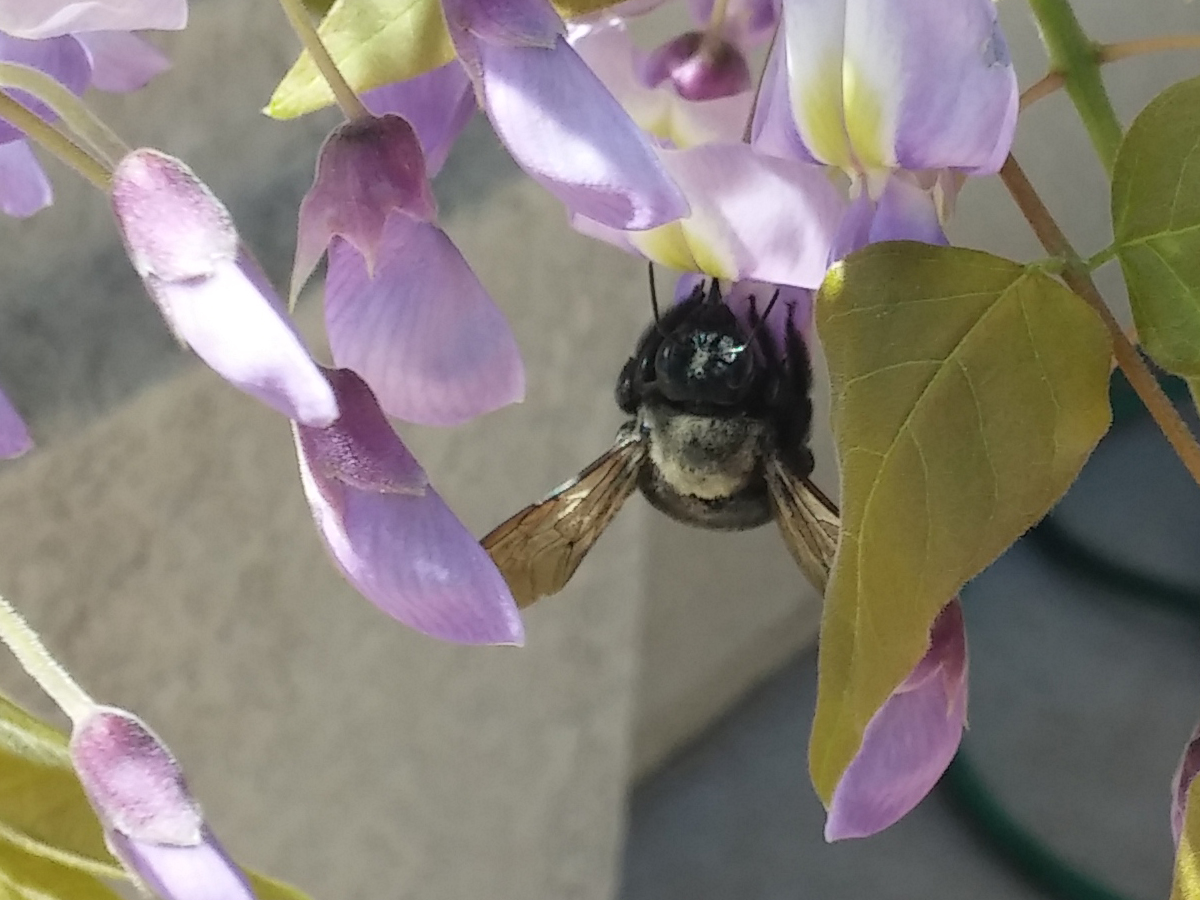
Female Xylocopa californica

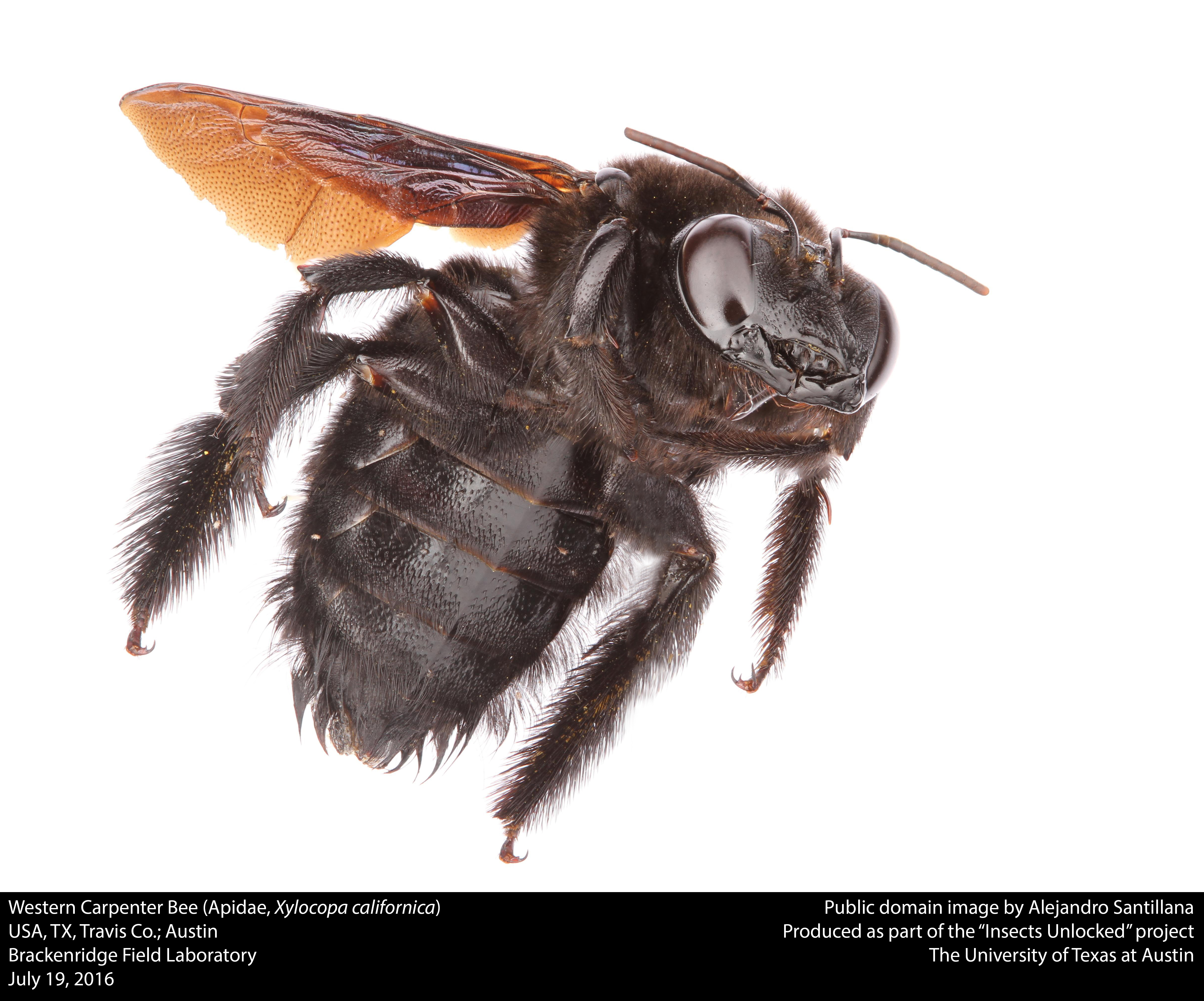
Xylocopa californica

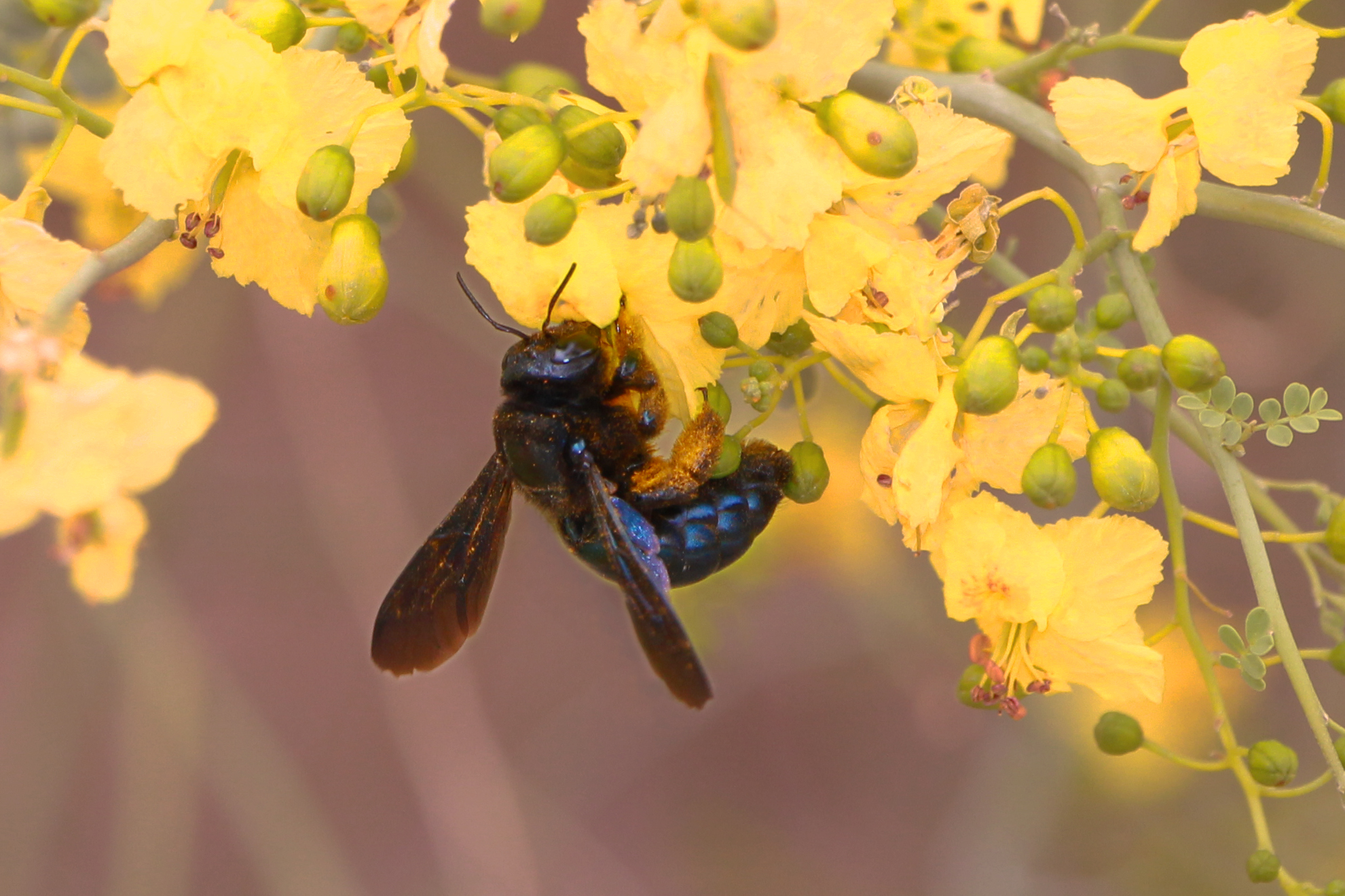
Xylocopa californica

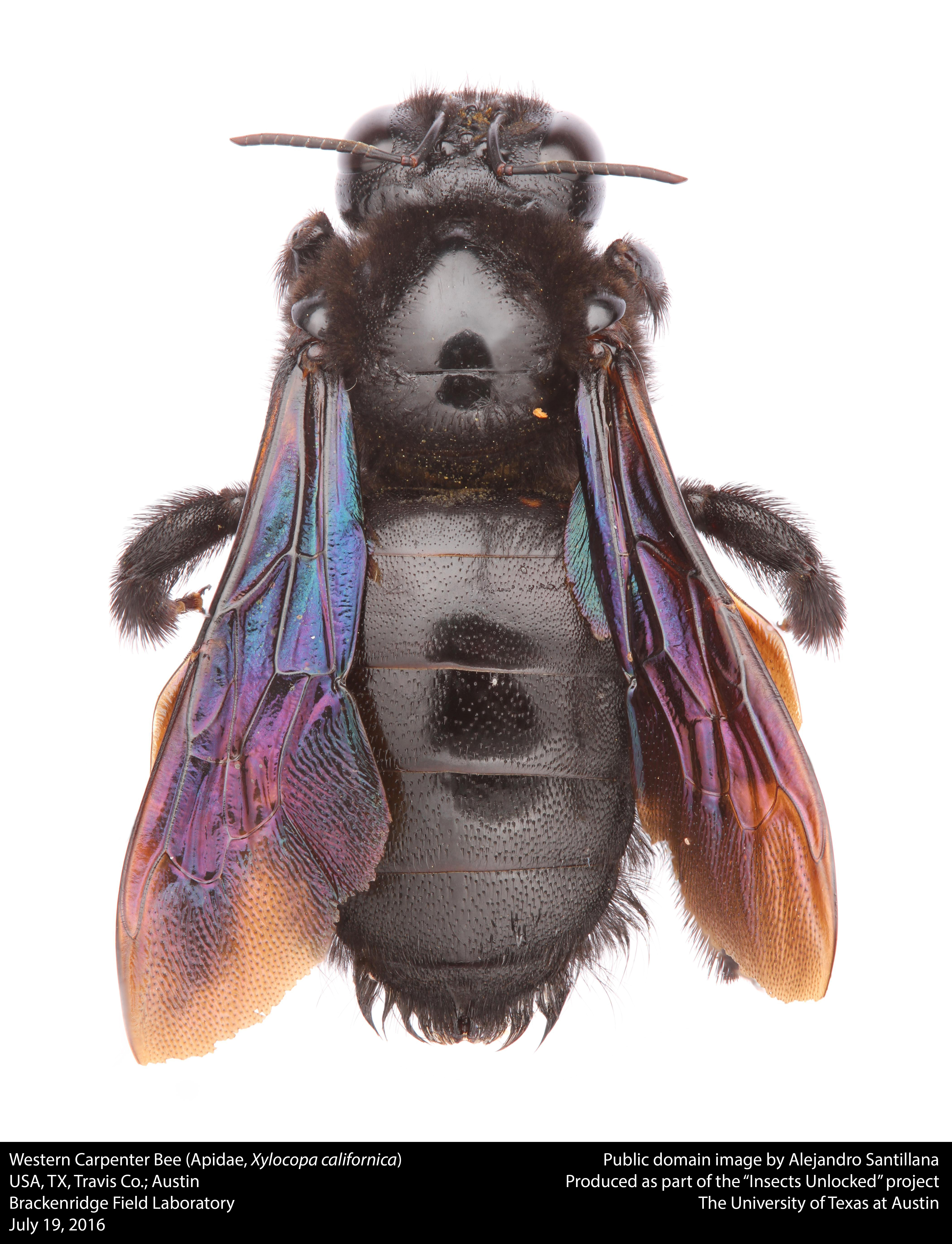
Xylocopa californica

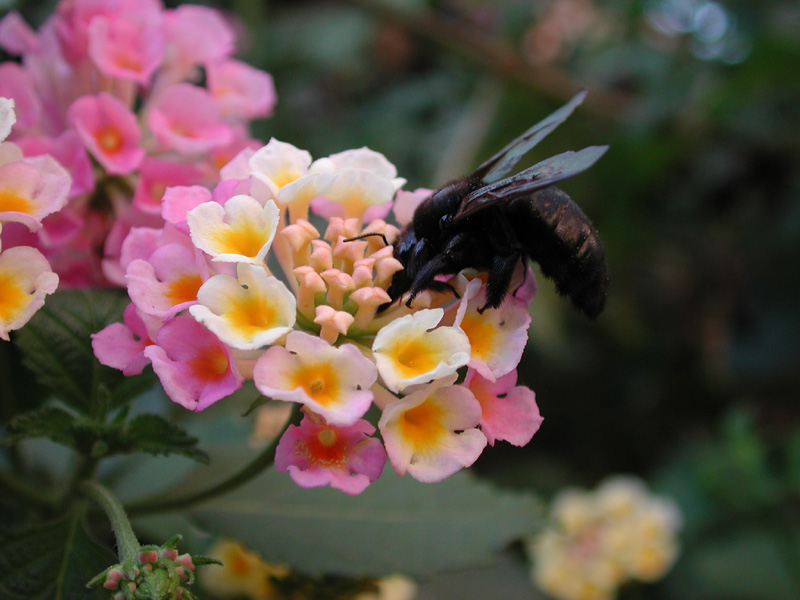
Xylocopa californica
