= List of Hoplitis species =

This is a list of 385 species in Hoplitis, a genus of leafcutter, mason, and resin bees in the family Megachilidae.

== Hoplitis species ==
- Hoplitis abbreviata (Morawitz, 1875)^{i c g}
- Hoplitis abnormis van der Zanden, 1992^{i c}
- Hoplitis abnormis van-der Zanden, 1992^{g}
- Hoplitis acanthophora (Morawitz, 1875)^{i c g}
- Hoplitis acuticornis (Dufour & Perris, 1840)^{i c g}
- Hoplitis adunca (Panzer, 1798)^{i c g}
- Hoplitis africana (Warncke, 1990)^{i c g}
- Hoplitis agis (Benoist, 1929)^{i c g}
- Hoplitis ahrensi (Popov, 1962)^{i c g}
- Hoplitis alatauensis (Tkalcu, 1992)^{i c g}
- Hoplitis alba (van der Zanden, 1994)^{i c g}
- Hoplitis albatera Warncke, 1991^{g}
- Hoplitis albifrons Leach, 1814^{i c g b}
- Hoplitis albopilosa Wu, 1987^{i c g}
- Hoplitis alboscopata (Provancher, 1888)^{i c g}
- Hoplitis alchata (Warncke, 1990)^{i c g}
- Hoplitis alexandrina (Warncke, 1991)^{i c g}
- Hoplitis anipuncta (Alfken, 1935)^{i c g}
- Hoplitis annulata (Latreille, 1811)^{i c g}
- Hoplitis anonyma (Cameron, 1904)^{i c g}
- Hoplitis antalyae Tkalcu, 2000^{i c g}
- Hoplitis antennata (Morawitz, 1876)^{i c g}
- Hoplitis anthocopoides (Schenck, 1853)^{i c g b}
- Hoplitis antigae (Pérez, 1895)^{i c g}
- Hoplitis aqabaensis (Warncke, 1991)^{i c g}
- Hoplitis arabiae Muller^{g}
- Hoplitis aravensis Zanden, 1992^{g}
- Hoplitis arenivaga van der Zanden, 1996^{i c}
- Hoplitis arenivaga van-der Zanden, 1996^{g}
- Hoplitis aristotelis (Warncke, 1990)^{i c g}
- Hoplitis askhabadensis (Radoszkowski, 1886)^{i c g}
- Hoplitis ayardi (Benoist, 1929)^{i c g}
- Hoplitis barbigera (Benoist, 1951)^{i c g}
- Hoplitis basingeri (Timberlake & Michener, 1950)^{i c g}
- Hoplitis bassana (Warncke, 1991)^{i c g}
- Hoplitis batyamae (van der Zanden, 1986)^{i c g}
- Hoplitis beijingensis Wu, 1987^{i c g}
- Hoplitis benoisti (Alfken, 1935)^{i c g}
- Hoplitis bicallosa (Morawitz, 1876)^{i c g}
- Hoplitis bidenticauda (Timberlake & Michener, 1950)^{i c g}
- Hoplitis bifoveolata (Alfken, 1935)^{i c g}
- Hoplitis bihamata (Costa, 1885)^{i c g}
- Hoplitis bilobulata Wu, 1992^{i c g}
- Hoplitis bipartita (Friese, 1899)^{i c g}
- Hoplitis biscutellae Cockerell, 1897^{i c g b}
- Hoplitis bispinosa van der Zanden, 1992^{i c}
- Hoplitis bispinosa van-der Zanden, 1992^{g}
- Hoplitis bisulca (Gerstäcker, 1869)^{i c g}
- Hoplitis boharti (Timberlake & Michener, 1950)^{i c g}
- Hoplitis bombiformis van der Zanden, 1991^{i c g}
- Hoplitis bombiformis van-der Zanden, 1991^{g}
- Hoplitis brachyodonta (Cockerell, 1933)^{i c g}
- Hoplitis brachypogon (Pérez, 1879)^{i c g}
- Hoplitis brevicornis (Morawitz, 1880)^{i c g}
- Hoplitis brevifurca (Benoist, 1934)^{i c g}
- Hoplitis brevispina (Tkalcu, 2000)^{i c g}
- Hoplitis brevispora (Warncke, 1992)^{i c g}
- Hoplitis brunnescens (Benoist, 1950)^{i c g}
- Hoplitis bubulca (van der Zanden, 1994)^{i c g}
- Hoplitis bullifacies Michener, 1947^{i c g b}
- Hoplitis bunocephala Michener, 1947^{i c g b}
- Hoplitis bytinskii (Mavromoustakis, 1948)^{i c}
- Hoplitis cadiza (Warncke, 1991)^{i c g}
- Hoplitis camelina (Benoist, 1934)^{i c g}
- Hoplitis campanularis (Morawitz, 1878)^{i c g}
- Hoplitis capsulifer Popov, 1960^{i c g}
- Hoplitis carinata (Stanek, 1969)^{i c g}
- Hoplitis carinotarsa Wu, 1987^{i c g}
- Hoplitis cathena (Cameron, 1904)^{i c g}
- Hoplitis caucasica (Friese, 1920)^{i c g}
- Hoplitis caucasicola ^{g}
- Hoplitis caudex (Timberlake & Michener, 1950)^{i c g}
- Hoplitis caularis (Morawitz, 1875)^{i c g}
- Hoplitis cercomela (Warncke, 1991)^{i c g}
- Hoplitis christae (Warncke, 1991)^{i c g}
- Hoplitis chukar (Warncke, 1991)^{i c g}
- Hoplitis ciliaris (Pérez, 1902)^{i c g}
- Hoplitis claviventris (Thomson, 1872)^{i c g}
- Hoplitis colei (Crawford, 1916)^{i c g}
- Hoplitis conchophila Kuhlmann, 2011^{g}
- Hoplitis conosimilis van der Zanden, 1992^{i c}
- Hoplitis conosimilis van-der Zanden, 1992^{g}
- Hoplitis contracta (Walker, 1871)^{i c g}
- Hoplitis corniculatus van-der Zanden, 1989^{g}
- Hoplitis crassipunctata Muller^{g}
- Hoplitis cretaea (Tkalcu, 1992)^{i c g}
- Hoplitis cristatula (van der Zanden, 1990)^{i c g}
- Hoplitis cryptanthae (Timberlake & Michener, 1950)^{i c g}
- Hoplitis ctenophora (Benoist, 1934)^{i c g}
- Hoplitis curtula (Pérez, 1895)^{i c g}
- Hoplitis curvipes (Morawitz, 1871)^{i c g}
- Hoplitis cypriaca (Mavromoustakis, 1938)^{i c g}
- Hoplitis dalmatica (Morawitz, 1871)^{i c g}
- Hoplitis daniana (Mavromoustakis, 1949)^{i c g}
- Hoplitis daurica (Radoszkowski, 1887)^{i c g}
- Hoplitis decaocta (Warncke, 1991)^{i c g}
- Hoplitis denudata (Morawitz, 1880)^{i c g}
- Hoplitis deserticola (Timberlake & Michener, 1950)^{i c g}
- Hoplitis desertorum Muller^{g}
- Hoplitis diabolica (Benoist, 1934)^{i c g}
- Hoplitis dispersipunctata Muller^{g}
- Hoplitis dorni Tkalcu, 1995^{i c g}
- Hoplitis duckeana (Kohl, 1905)^{i c g}
- Hoplitis dumonti (Benoist, 1929)^{i c g}
- Hoplitis eburnea (Warncke, 1991)^{i c g}
- Hoplitis elaziga (Warncke, 1991)^{i c g}
- Hoplitis elongaticeps Michener, 1947^{i c g b}
- Hoplitis emarginata (Griswold, 1983)^{i c g}
- Hoplitis enslini (Alfken, 1935)^{i c g}
- Hoplitis epeoliformis (Ducke, 1899)^{i c g}
- Hoplitis eremophila (Warncke, 1991)^{i c g}
- Hoplitis erythrogastra (Mavromoustakis, 1954)^{i c g}
- Hoplitis erzurumensis Tkalcu, 2000^{i c g}
- Hoplitis evansi (Michener, 1936)^{i c g}
- Hoplitis excisa (Morawitz, 1880)^{i c g}
- Hoplitis fabrei van der Zanden, 1987^{i c}
- Hoplitis fabrei van-der Zanden, 1987^{g}
- Hoplitis farabensis (Popov, 1962)^{i c g}
- Hoplitis fascicularia (Radoszkowski, 1886)^{i c g}
- Hoplitis fasciculata (Alfken, 1934)^{g}
- Hoplitis ferianaensis (van der Zanden, 1991)^{i c g}
- Hoplitis fertoni (Pérez, 1891)^{i c g}
- Hoplitis flabellifera (Morice, 1901)^{i c g}
- Hoplitis fortispina (Pérez, 1895)^{i c g}
- Hoplitis fossulata (Mocsáry, 1883)^{i c g}
- Hoplitis freygessneri (Friese, 1899)^{i c g}
- Hoplitis fulgida Cronquist^{i c g b}
- Hoplitis fulica (Warncke, 1991)^{i c g}
- Hoplitis fulva (Eversmann, 1852)^{i c g}
- Hoplitis furcula (Morawitz, 1875)^{i c g}
- Hoplitis galbula (Warncke, 1991)^{i c g}
- Hoplitis galichicae Muller^{g}
- Hoplitis gallinula (Warncke, 1991)^{i c g}
- Hoplitis garzetta (Warncke, 1991)^{i c g}
- Hoplitis gentilis (Warncke, 1991)^{i c g}
- Hoplitis gerofita (Warncke, 1990)^{i c g}
- Hoplitis glasunovi (Morawitz, 1894)^{i c g}
- Hoplitis gleasoni (Titus, 1904)^{i c g}
- Hoplitis gobiensis Muller^{g}
- Hoplitis goulemina (Warncke, 1991)^{i c g}
- Hoplitis graeca (Tkalcu, 2000)^{i c g}
- Hoplitis grandiscapa (Pérez, 1895)^{i c g}
- Hoplitis grinnelli (Cockerell, 1910)^{i c g}
- Hoplitis grossepunctata (Kohl, 1905)^{i c g}
- Hoplitis grumi (Morawitz, 1894)^{i c g}
- Hoplitis gusenleitneri (Warncke, 1991)^{i c g}
- Hoplitis haemi Tkalcu, 2000^{i c g}
- Hoplitis halophila Cross, 2023
- Hoplitis hamulicornis (Timberlake & Michener, 1950)^{i c g}
- Hoplitis heilungjiangensis Wu, 1987^{i c g}
- Hoplitis heinrichi van der Zanden, 1980^{i c g}
- Hoplitis heinrichi van-der Zanden, 1980^{g}
- Hoplitis helouanensis (Friese, 1899)^{i c g}
- Hoplitis hemisphaerica (Alfken, 1935)^{i c g}
- Hoplitis hierichonica (Mavromoustakis, 1949)^{i c g}
- Hoplitis hilbera ^{g}
- Hoplitis hofferi Tkalcu, 1977^{i c g}
- Hoplitis hoggara (Warncke, 1992)^{i c g}
- Hoplitis holmboei (Mavromoustakis, 1948)^{i c g}
- Hoplitis homalocera van der Zanden, 1991^{i c}
- Hoplitis homalocera van-der Zanden, 1991^{g}
- Hoplitis howardi (Cockerell, 1910)^{i c g}
- Hoplitis hyperplastica (Morawitz, 1894)^{i c g}
- Hoplitis hypocrita (A. Massal.) Fröberg, 1989^{i c g b}
- Hoplitis idaensis (Warncke, 1991)^{i c g}
- Hoplitis idalia (Mavromoustakis, 1948)^{i c g}
- Hoplitis ilamana (van der Zanden, 1994)^{i c g}
- Hoplitis illustris van der Zanden, 1992^{i c g}
- Hoplitis illustris van-der Zanden, 1992^{g}
- Hoplitis illyrica (Noskiewicz, 1926)^{i c g}
- Hoplitis imperfecta (Provancher, 1896)^{i c g}
- Hoplitis improceros van der Zanden, 1998^{i c}
- Hoplitis improceros van-der Zanden, 1998^{g}
- Hoplitis incanescens (Cockerell, 1922)^{i c g b}
- Hoplitis incognita van der Zanden, 1996^{i c}
- Hoplitis incognita van-der Zanden, 1996^{g}
- Hoplitis inconspicua Tkalcu, 1995^{i c g}
- Hoplitis indostana (Cameron, 1904)^{i c g}
- Hoplitis infrapicta (Cockerell, 1916)^{i c g}
- Hoplitis insolita (Benoist, 1928)^{i c g}
- Hoplitis insularis (Schmiedeknecht, 1885)^{i c g}
- Hoplitis irania (Warncke, 1991)^{i c g}
- Hoplitis israelica (Warncke, 1991)^{i c g}
- Hoplitis jacintana (Cockerell, 1910)^{i c g}
- Hoplitis jakovlevi (Radoszkowski, 1874)^{i c g}
- Hoplitis jejuna Popov, 1952^{i c g}
- Hoplitis jerichoensis (van der Zanden, 1996)^{i c g}
- Hoplitis jheringii (Ducke, 1898)^{i c g}
- Hoplitis karakalensis (Popov, 1936)^{i c g}
- Hoplitis karikalensis (Peters, 1972)^{i c g}
- Hoplitis kaszabi Tkalcu, 2000^{i c g}
- Hoplitis kotschisa Warncke, 1991^{g}
- Hoplitis laboriosa (Smith, 1878)^{i c}
- Hoplitis laevibullata (Michener, 1943)^{i c g}
- Hoplitis laevifrons (Morawitz, 1872)^{i c g}
- Hoplitis laeviscutum (Alfken, 1935)^{i c g}
- Hoplitis lamina (Pérez, 1895)^{i c g}
- Hoplitis laminifera Popov, 1960^{i c g}
- Hoplitis lapidaria (Morawitz, 1878)^{i c g}
- Hoplitis latifemoralis (Wu, 1985)^{i c g}
- Hoplitis latuspilosa van der Zanden, 1992^{i c}
- Hoplitis latuspilosa van-der Zanden, 1992^{g}
- Hoplitis lebanotica (Mavromoustakis, 1955)^{i c g}
- Hoplitis lecerfi (Benoist, 1929)^{i c g}
- Hoplitis lefeberi van der Zanden, 1991^{i c}
- Hoplitis lefeberi van-der Zanden, 1991^{g}
- Hoplitis leiocephala (Mavromoustakis, 1954)^{i c g}
- Hoplitis lepeletieri (Pérez, 1879)^{i c g}
- Hoplitis leucomelana (Kirby, 1802)^{i c g}
- Hoplitis libanensis (Morice, 1901)^{i c g}
- Hoplitis limassolica (Mavromoustakis, 1937)^{i c g}
- Hoplitis linguaria (Morawitz, 1876)^{i c g}
- Hoplitis linsdalei Michener, 1947^{i c g}
- Hoplitis lithodorae Müller, 2012^{g}
- Hoplitis loboclypeata Wu, 1990^{i c g}
- Hoplitis longispina (Pérez, 1895)^{i c g}
- Hoplitis loreicornis (Benoist, 1934)^{i c g}
- Hoplitis loti (Morawitz, 1867)^{i c g}
- Hoplitis louisae (Cockerell, 1934)^{i c}
- Hoplitis lucidula (Benoist, 1934)^{i c g}
- Hoplitis lysholmi (Friese, 1899)^{i c g}
- Hoplitis maghrebensis (van der Zanden, 1992)^{i c g}
- Hoplitis malyshevi (Popov, 1963)^{i c g}
- Hoplitis manicata (Morice, 1901)^{i c g}
- Hoplitis manuelae ^{g}
- Hoplitis marchali (Pérez, 1902)^{i c g}
- Hoplitis maritima (Romankova, 1985)^{i c g}
- Hoplitis maroccana (van der Zanden, 1998)^{i c g}
- Hoplitis matheranensis (Michener, 1966)^{i c g}
- Hoplitis mazzuccoi (Schwarz & Gusenleitner, 2005)^{i c g}
- Hoplitis meyeri (Benoist, 1934)^{i c g}
- Hoplitis micheneri Mitchell, 1962^{i c g}
- Hoplitis minor (Morawitz, 1878)^{i c g}
- Hoplitis minuta Wu, 1990^{i c g}
- Hoplitis mitis (Nylander, 1852)^{i c g}
- Hoplitis mocsaryi (Friese, 1895)^{i c g}
- Hoplitis mojavensis Michener, 1947^{i c g}
- Hoplitis mollis Tkalcu, 2000^{i c g}
- Hoplitis mongolica Wu, 1990^{i c g}
- Hoplitis monstrabilis Tkalcu, 2000^{i c g}
- Hoplitis monticola ^{g}
- Hoplitis moricei (Friese, 1899)^{i c g}
- Hoplitis morinella (Warncke, 1991)^{i c g}
- Hoplitis mucida (Dours, 1873)^{i c g}
- Hoplitis murina (Tkalcu, 1992)^{i c g}
- Hoplitis mutica (Warncke, 1991)^{i c g}
- Hoplitis nanula (Timberlake & Michener, 1950)^{i c g}
- Hoplitis nasoincisa (Ferton, 1914)^{i c g}
- Hoplitis neavei (Cockerell, 1936)^{i c g}
- Hoplitis negevensis (Warncke, 1991)^{i c g}
- Hoplitis nicolaei ^{g}
- Hoplitis nigrella (Michener, 1954)^{i c g}
- Hoplitis nigrocolor (van der Zanden, 1991)^{i c g}
- Hoplitis nisa (Warncke, 1991)^{i c g}
- Hoplitis nitidula (Morawitz, 1878)^{i c g}
- Hoplitis obtusa (Friese, 1899)^{i c g}
- Hoplitis occidentalis Müller, 2012^{g}
- Hoplitis ochraceicornis (Ferton, 1902)^{i c g}
- Hoplitis ochruros (Warncke, 1991)^{i c g}
- Hoplitis onychophora (Mavromoustakis, 1939)^{i c g}
- Hoplitis oreades (Benoist, 1934)^{i c g}
- Hoplitis orthodonta (Cockerell, 1932)^{i c g}
- Hoplitis orthognatha (Griswold, 1983)^{i c g}
- Hoplitis oxypyga (Benoist, 1927)^{i c g}
- Hoplitis ozbeki Tkalcu, 2000^{i c g}
- Hoplitis paiute (Griswold, 1983)^{i c g}
- Hoplitis pallicornis (Friese, 1895)^{i c g}
- Hoplitis palmarum (Cockerell, 1935)^{i c g}
- Hoplitis papaveris (Latreille, 1799)^{i c g}
- Hoplitis paralias (Mavromoustakis, 1954)^{i c g}
- Hoplitis parana (Warncke, 1991)^{i c g}
- Hoplitis parasitica (Warncke, 1991)^{i c g}
- Hoplitis parnesica (Mavromoustakis, 1958)^{i c g}
- Hoplitis paroselae Michener, 1947^{i c g}
- Hoplitis peniculifera ^{g}
- Hoplitis peralba van der Zanden, 1992^{i c}
- Hoplitis peralba van-der Zanden, 1992^{g}
- Hoplitis perezi (Ferton, 1895)^{i c g}
- Hoplitis persica (Warncke, 1991)^{i c g}
- Hoplitis pici (Friese, 1899)^{i c g}
- Hoplitis picicornis (Morawitz, 1895)^{i c g}
- Hoplitis pilosifrons (Cresson, 1864)^{i c g}
- Hoplitis pinkeunia (Warncke, 1991)^{i c g}
- Hoplitis pisidiae Tkalcu, 2000^{i c g}
- Hoplitis plagiostoma Michener, 1947^{i c g}
- Hoplitis platalea (Warncke, 1990)^{i c g}
- Hoplitis pomarina (Warncke, 1991)^{i c g}
- Hoplitis popovi Wu, 2004^{i c g}
- Hoplitis praestans (Morawitz, 1893)^{i c g}
- Hoplitis premordica Griswold, 1998^{i c g}
- Hoplitis princeps (Morawitz, 1872)^{i c g}
- Hoplitis procerior (Tkalcu, 2000)^{i c g}
- Hoplitis producta (Cresson, 1864)^{i c b}
- Hoplitis pulchella (Pérez, 1895)^{i c g}
- Hoplitis pungens (Benoist, 1929)^{i c g}
- Hoplitis pygmaea (Timberlake & Michener, 1950)^{i c g}
- Hoplitis pyrrhosoma Wu, 1990^{i c g}
- Hoplitis quadrispina (Tkalcu, 1992)^{i c g}
- Hoplitis quarzazati (van der Zanden, 1998)^{i c g}
- Hoplitis quettensis Tkalcu, 2000^{i c g}
- Hoplitis quinquespinosa (Friese, 1899)^{i c g}
- Hoplitis ravouxi (Pérez, 1902)^{i c g}
- Hoplitis recticauda (Stanek, 1969)^{i c g}
- Hoplitis reducta (Timberlake & Michener, 1950)^{i c g}
- Hoplitis remotula (Cockerell, 1910)^{i c g}
- Hoplitis ridibunda (Warncke, 1991)^{i c g}
- Hoplitis robusta (Nylander, 1848)^{i c g}
- Hoplitis rubricrus (Friese, 1899)^{i c g}
- Hoplitis ruficornis (Morawitz, 1875)^{i c}
- Hoplitis ruficrus (Morawitz, 1875)^{i c g}
- Hoplitis rufimana (Morawitz, 1875)^{i c g}
- Hoplitis rufoantennalis Wu, 2004^{i c g}
- Hoplitis rufopicta (Morawitz, 1875)^{i c g}
- Hoplitis rugidorsis (Pérez, 1895)^{i c g}
- Hoplitis samarkanda (Warncke, 1991)^{i c g}
- Hoplitis sambuci Titus, 1904^{i c g}
- Hoplitis saundersi (Vachal, 1891)^{i c g}
- Hoplitis saxialis (van der Zanden, 1994)^{i c g}
- Hoplitis scita (Eversmann, 1852)^{i c g}
- Hoplitis segura (Warncke, 1991)^{i c g}
- Hoplitis semilinguaria Tkalcu, 1992^{i c g}
- Hoplitis seminigra (Timberlake & Michener, 1950)^{i c g}
- Hoplitis semirubra (Cockerell, 1898)^{i c g}
- Hoplitis serainae ^{g}
- Hoplitis shoshone (Parker, 1976)^{i c g}
- Hoplitis sichuanensis Wu, 1992^{i c g}
- Hoplitis significans Tkalcu, 1995^{i c g}
- Hoplitis similis (Timberlake & Michener, 1950)^{i c g}
- Hoplitis simplex (Cresson, 1864)^{i c g}
- Hoplitis simplicata (Warncke, 1991)^{i c g}
- Hoplitis simplicicornis (Morawitz, 1875)^{i c g}
- Hoplitis simula (Gribodo, 1894)^{i c g}
- Hoplitis singularis (Morawitz, 1875)^{i c g}
- Hoplitis sinuata (Pérez, 1895)^{i c g}
- Hoplitis sordida (Benoist, 1929)^{i c g}
- Hoplitis speculum (Benoist, 1934)^{i c g}
- Hoplitis speculumoides van der Zanden, 1991^{i c}
- Hoplitis speculumoides van-der Zanden, 1991^{g}
- Hoplitis spoliata (Provancher, 1888)^{i c g b}
- Hoplitis stellaris (Warncke, 1991)^{i c g}
- Hoplitis strepera (Warncke, 1991)^{i c g}
- Hoplitis strymonia Tkalcu, 1999^{i c g}
- Hoplitis subbutea (Warncke, 1991)^{i c g}
- Hoplitis submanicata van der Zanden, 1984^{i c}
- Hoplitis submanicata van-der Zanden, 1984^{g}
- Hoplitis subulicornis (Morawitz, 1878)^{i c g}
- Hoplitis taenioceras (Benoist, 1927)^{i c g}
- Hoplitis taurimordax (Peters, 1983)^{i c g}
- Hoplitis tenuicornis (Morawitz, 1875)^{i c g}
- Hoplitis tenuiserrata (Benoist, 1950)^{i c g}
- Hoplitis tenuispina (Alfken, 1937)^{i c g}
- Hoplitis testaceozonata (Alfken, 1935)^{i c g}
- Hoplitis teucrii (Benoist, 1927)^{i c g}
- Hoplitis tibetensis Wu, 1987^{i c g}
- Hoplitis tigrina (Morawitz, 1872)^{i c g}
- Hoplitis tkalcuella Le Goff, 2003^{i c g}
- Hoplitis torchioi (Parker, 1979)^{i c g}
- Hoplitis tricolor (Saunders, 1908)^{i c g}
- Hoplitis tridentata (Dufour & Perris, 1840)^{i c g}
- Hoplitis tringa (Warncke, 1991)^{i c g}
- Hoplitis tristis (Michener, 1936)^{i c g}
- Hoplitis truicauda (Timberlake & Michener, 1950)^{i c g}
- Hoplitis truncata (Cresson, 1878)^{i c g}
- Hoplitis tuberculata (Nylander, 1848)^{i c g}
- Hoplitis tunica (Warncke, 1991)^{i c g}
- Hoplitis ulaangomensis (Tkalcu, 1995)^{i c g}
- Hoplitis uncaticornis (Stanek, 1969)^{i c g}
- Hoplitis unispina (Alfken, 1935)^{i c g}
- Hoplitis urfensis (van der Zanden, 1984)^{i c g}
- Hoplitis ursina (Friese, 1920)^{i c g}
- Hoplitis uvulalis (Cockerell, 1902)^{i c g}
- Hoplitis verhoeffi (Mavromoustakis, 1954)^{i c g}
- Hoplitis verruciventris (Morawitz, 1886)^{i c g}
- Hoplitis villiersi (Benoist, 1950)^{i c g}
- Hoplitis villosa (Schenck, 1853)^{i c}
- Hoplitis viridimicans (Cockerell, 1897)^{i c g}
- Hoplitis wadicola (Alfken, 1935)^{i c g}
- Hoplitis wahrmani (Mavromoustakis, 1948)^{i c g}
- Hoplitis xanthoprymna (Warncke, 1991)^{i c g}
- Hoplitis xerophila (Cockerell, 1935)^{i c g}
- Hoplitis xinjiangensis Wu, 1987^{i c g}
- Hoplitis yermasoyiae (Mavromoustakis, 1938)^{i c g}
- Hoplitis zaianorum (Benoist, 1927)^{i c g}
- Hoplitis zandeni (Teunissen & van Achterberg, 1992)^{i c g}
- Hoplitis zonalis (Pérez, 1895)^{i c g}
- Hoplitis zuni (Parker, 1977)^{i c g}

Data sources: i = ITIS, c = Catalogue of Life, g = GBIF, b = Bugguide.net
