= List of Heriades species =

These 139 species belong to Heriades, a genus of leafcutter, mason, and resin bees in the family Megachilidae.

== Heriades species ==
- Heriades abessinicus Friese, 1915^{i c g}
- Heriades albiscopanus Strand, 1912^{i c g}
- Heriades aldabranus Cockerell, 1912^{i c g}
- Heriades alfkeni Benoist, 1938^{i c g}
- Heriades ambiguus Cockerell, 1946^{i c g}
- Heriades ammodendri Popov, 1960^{i c g}
- Heriades angusticeps Cockerell, 1937^{i c g}
- Heriades angustulus Cockerell, 1937^{i c g}
- Heriades apriculus Griswold, 1998^{i c g}
- Heriades arcuatellus Cockerell, 1937^{i c g}
- Heriades arnoldi Friese, 1922^{i c g}
- Heriades bequaerti Cockerell, 1931^{i c g}
- Heriades bequerti Cockerell, 1931^{g}
- Heriades binodosus Cockerell, 1936^{i c g}
- Heriades bouyssoui Vachal, 1903^{i c g}
- Heriades brage Strand, 1912^{i c g}
- Heriades bruneri Titus, 1904^{i c g}
- Heriades burgeoni Benoist, 1931^{i c g}
- Heriades canalicaulata Benoist, 1931^{g}
- Heriades canaliculatus Benoist, 1931^{i c g}
- Heriades cancavus Wu, 1982^{i c g}
- Heriades capicola Strand, 1912^{i c g}
- Heriades carinata Cresson, 1864^{i b}
- Heriades carinatus Cresson, 1864^{c g}
- Heriades chariensis Benoist, 1931^{i c g}
- Heriades chrysogaster (Cameron, 1897)^{i c g}
- Heriades chubbi Cockerell, 1916^{i c g}
- Heriades cingulata Benoist, 1931^{i}
- Heriades cingulatus Benoist, 1931^{c g}
- Heriades civicus Cockerell, 1937^{i c g}
- Heriades clavicornis Morawitz, 1875^{i c g}
- Heriades crenulatus Nylander, 1856^{i c g}
- Heriades cressoni Michener, 1938^{i c g}
- Heriades crucifer Cockerell, 1897^{i c g}
- Heriades currani Michener, 1943^{i c g}
- Heriades curviventris Strand, 1912^{i c g}
- Heriades dalmaticus Maidl, 1922^{i c g}
- Heriades debilicornis Cockerell, 1940^{i c g}
- Heriades diminutus Cockerell, 1937^{i c g}
- Heriades discrepans Benoist, 1938^{i c g}
- Heriades edentatus Friese, 1922^{g}
- Heriades ellenbergeri Benoist, 1931^{i c g}
- Heriades erythrosoma Friese, 1922^{i c g}
- Heriades eximius Friese, 1904^{i c g}
- Heriades fertoni Benoist, 1938^{i c g}
- Heriades filicornis Friese, 1915^{i c g}
- Heriades flocciferus Brauns, 1929^{i c g}
- Heriades freygessneri Schletterer, 1889^{i c g}
- Heriades frontosus Schletterer, 1889^{i c g}
- Heriades fuelleborni Friese, 1922^{i c g}
- Heriades fujiyamai Yasumatsu & Hirashima, 1952^{i c g}
- Heriades fulleborni Friese, 1922^{i c g}
- Heriades fulvescens Cockerell, 1920^{i c g}
- Heriades fulvohispidus Yasumatsu & Hirashima, 1952^{i c g}
- Heriades gibbosus (Friese, 1909)^{i c g}
- Heriades glomerans Schletterer, 1889^{c g}
- Heriades glutinosus Giraud, 1871^{g}
- Heriades gracilior Cockerell, 1897^{i c g}
- Heriades hercules Strand, 1911^{i c g}
- Heriades hierosolomitus Benoist, 1935^{i c g}
- Heriades hissaricus Popov, 1955^{i c g}
- Heriades impressus Schletterer, 1889^{i c g}
- Heriades ingogoensis Cockerell, 1946^{i c g}
- Heriades labiatus Pérez, 1896^{i c g}
- Heriades langenburgicus Strand, 1911^{i c g}
- Heriades laosellus Cockerell, 1929^{i c g}
- Heriades latipes Popov, 1960^{i c g}
- Heriades leavitti Crawford, 1913^{i c g b}
- Heriades libericus Cockerell, 1931^{i c g}
- Heriades longicornis (Friese, 1915)^{i c g}
- Heriades longispinis Cockerell, 1944^{i c g}
- Heriades macrognatus Vachal, 1909^{i c g}
- Heriades mamilliferus Brauns, 1929^{i c g}
- Heriades mandibularis Friese, 1922^{i c g}
- Heriades micheneri Timberlake, 1947^{i c g}
- Heriades micropthalma Michener, 1954^{i c g}
- Heriades microstictus Cockerell, 1936^{i c g}
- Heriades mundulus Cockerell, 1920^{i c g}
- Heriades nasiferus Cockerell, 1946^{i c g}
- Heriades nitescens Cockerell, 1931^{i c g}
- Heriades nodulosus Cockerell, 1937^{i c g}
- Heriades occidentalis Michener, 1938^{i c g}
- Heriades orientalis Gupta, 1987^{i c g}
- Heriades ornaticornis Cockerell, 1936^{i c g}
- Heriades otavica Eardley & R. P. Urban, 2006^{i}
- Heriades otavicus Eardley & R. P. Urban, 2006^{c g}
- Heriades othonis Friese, 1914^{i c g}
- Heriades pachyacanthus Cockerell, 1940^{i c g}
- Heriades paganensis Yasumatsu, 1942^{i c g}
- Heriades parvulus Bingham, 1897^{i c g}
- Heriades patellus (Nurse, 1902)^{i c g}
- Heriades perminutus Cockerell, 1935^{i c g}
- Heriades perpolitus Cockerell, 1946^{i c g}
- Heriades phthisica Gerstäcker, 1858^{i}
- Heriades phthisicus Gerstäcker, 1857^{c g}
- Heriades plumosus Krombein, 1950^{i c g}
- Heriades pogonura Benoist, 1931^{i c g}
- Heriades pretorii Cockerell, 1946^{i c g}
- Heriades prionsa (Cameron, 1905)^{i c g}
- Heriades psiadiae Pauly & Griswold, 2001^{i c g}
- Heriades punctulatus Cockerell, 1917^{i c g}
- Heriades punctulifer Schletterer, 1889^{c g}
- Heriades punctulifera Schletterer, 1889^{i}
- Heriades rowlandi (Cockerell, 1947)^{i c g}
- Heriades rubicolus Pérez, 1890^{i c g}
- Heriades rufifrons Cockerell, 1932^{i c g}
- Heriades sakishimanus Yasumatsu & Hirashima, 1965^{i c g}
- Heriades sauteri Cockerell, 1911^{i c g}
- Heriades schwarzi Griswold, 1998^{i c g}
- Heriades scutellatus Friese, 1922^{i c g}
- Heriades seyrigi Pauly & Griswold, 2001^{i c g}
- Heriades shestakovi Popov, 1960^{i c g}
- Heriades sinuatus Spinola, 1808^{i c g}
- Heriades spiniscutis (Cameron, 1905)^{i c g}
- Heriades strictifrons Cockerell, 1946^{i c g}
- Heriades subfrontosus Cockerell, 1939^{i c g}
- Heriades sulcatiferus Cockerell, 1937^{i c g}
- Heriades sulcatifrons Cockerell, 1936^{i c g}
- Heriades sulcatulus Cockerell, 1931^{i c g}
- Heriades swarzi Griswold, 1998^{g}
- Heriades tayrona Gonzalez & Griswold, 2011^{g}
- Heriades tenuis Nurse, 1904^{i c g}
- Heriades testaceicornis (Cameron, 1908)^{i c g}
- Heriades texanus Michener, 1938^{i c g}
- Heriades timberlakei Michener, 1938^{i c g}
- Heriades trigibbiferus Brauns, 1929^{i c g}
- Heriades trigibliferus Brauns, 1929^{g}
- Heriades truncorum (Linnaeus, 1758)^{i c g}
- Heriades turcomanicus Popov, 1955^{i c g}
- Heriades usakensis Cockerell, 1937^{i c g}
- Heriades ustulata Benoist, 1931^{i}
- Heriades ustulatus Benoist, 1931^{c g}
- Heriades variolosus (Cresson, 1872)^{i c g}
- Heriades victoriae Friese, 1922^{i c g}
- Heriades wellmani Cockerell, 1908^{i c g}
- Heriades wilmattae Cockerell, 1931^{i c g}
- Heriades xanthogaster Cockerell, 1932^{i c g}
- Heriades yunnanensis Wu, 1992^{i c g}

Data sources: i = ITIS, c = Catalogue of Life, g = GBIF, b = Bugguide.net
