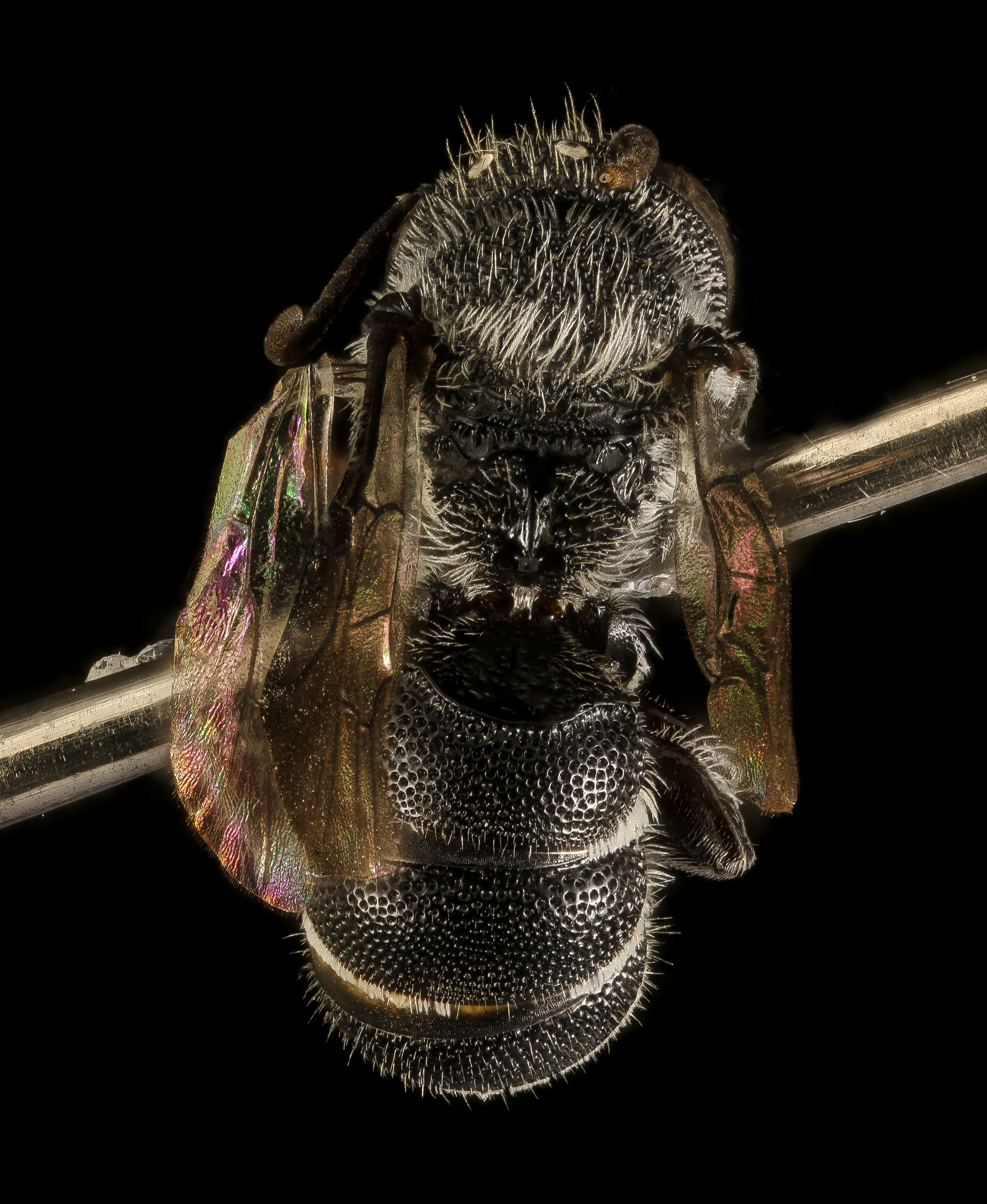
- Heriades (Neotrypetes) leavitti

Scientific classification
- Kingdom: Animalia
- Phylum: Arthropoda
- Class: Insecta
- Order: Hymenoptera
- Family: Megachilidae
- Genus: Heriades
- Subgenus: Neotrypetes; Robertson, 1918

= Neotrypetes =

Subgenus of bees

Neotrypetes is a subgenus of the Heriades genus of bees and is the only group of Heriades in the Americas. Specifically they are found from southern Canada to Panama, but are mostly found in Mexico. It is identifiable by its lack of preoccipital and juxtantennal carinae and a scute that is strongly curved down anteriorly.

The subgenus consists of 21 species:

- Heriades (Neotrypetes) amanda Rojas-Arias, Griswold & Ayala 2025
- Heriades (Neotrypetes) briceida Rojas-Arias, Griswold & Ayala 2025
- Heriades (Neotrypetes) bruneri Titus, 1904
- Heriades (Neotrypetes) carinata Cresson, 1864
- Heriades (Neotrypetes) cressoni Michener, 1938
- Heriades (Neotrypetes) crucifera Cockerell, 1897
- Heriades (Neotrypetes) cristina Rojas-Arias, Griswold & Ayala 2025
- Heriades (Neotrypetes) currani Michener
- Heriades (Neotrypetes) danuncia Rojas-Arias, Griswold & Ayala 2025
- Heriades (Neotrypetes) leavitti Crawford, 1913
- Heriades (Neotrypetes) luisa Rojas-Arias, Griswold & Ayala 2025
- Heriades (Neotrypetes) mariana Rojas-Arias, Griswold & Ayala 2025
- Heriades (Neotrypetes) micheneri Timberlake, 1947
- Heriades (Neotrypetes) microthalma Michener, 1954
- Heriades (Neotrypetes) nora Rojas-Arias, Griswold & Ayala 2025
- Heriades (Neotrypetes) occidentalis Michener, 1938
- Heriades (Neotrypetes) texana Michener, 1938
- Heriades (Neotrypetes) timberlakei Michener, 1938
- Heriades (Neotrypetes) variolosa Cresson, 1872
- Heriades (Neotrypetes) viridiana Rojas-Arias, Griswold & Ayala, 2025
- Heriades (Neotrypetes) vulcanica Rojas-Arias, Griswold & Ayala 2025
