= Hoplitis incanescens =

Scientific classification
- Kingdom: Animalia
- Phylum: Arthropoda
- Class: Insecta
- Order: Hymenoptera
- Family: Megachilidae
- Tribe: Osmiini
- Genus: Hoplitis
- Species: H. incanescens

Binomial name
- Hoplitis incanescens (Cockerell, 1922)

Species of bee

Hoplitis incanescens is a species of bee in the family Megachilidae. It is found in North America.

== Subspecies ==
These two subspecies belong to the species Hoplitis incanescens:

- Hoplitis incanescens incanescens
- Hoplitis incanescens tota
