= Ashmeadiella bigeloviae =

Scientific classification
- Kingdom: Animalia
- Phylum: Arthropoda
- Class: Insecta
- Order: Hymenoptera
- Family: Megachilidae
- Tribe: Osmiini
- Genus: Ashmeadiella
- Species: A. bigeloviae

Binomial name
- Ashmeadiella bigeloviae (Cockerell, 1897)

Species of bee

Ashmeadiella bigeloviae is a species of bee in the family Megachilidae. It is found in Central America and North America.
