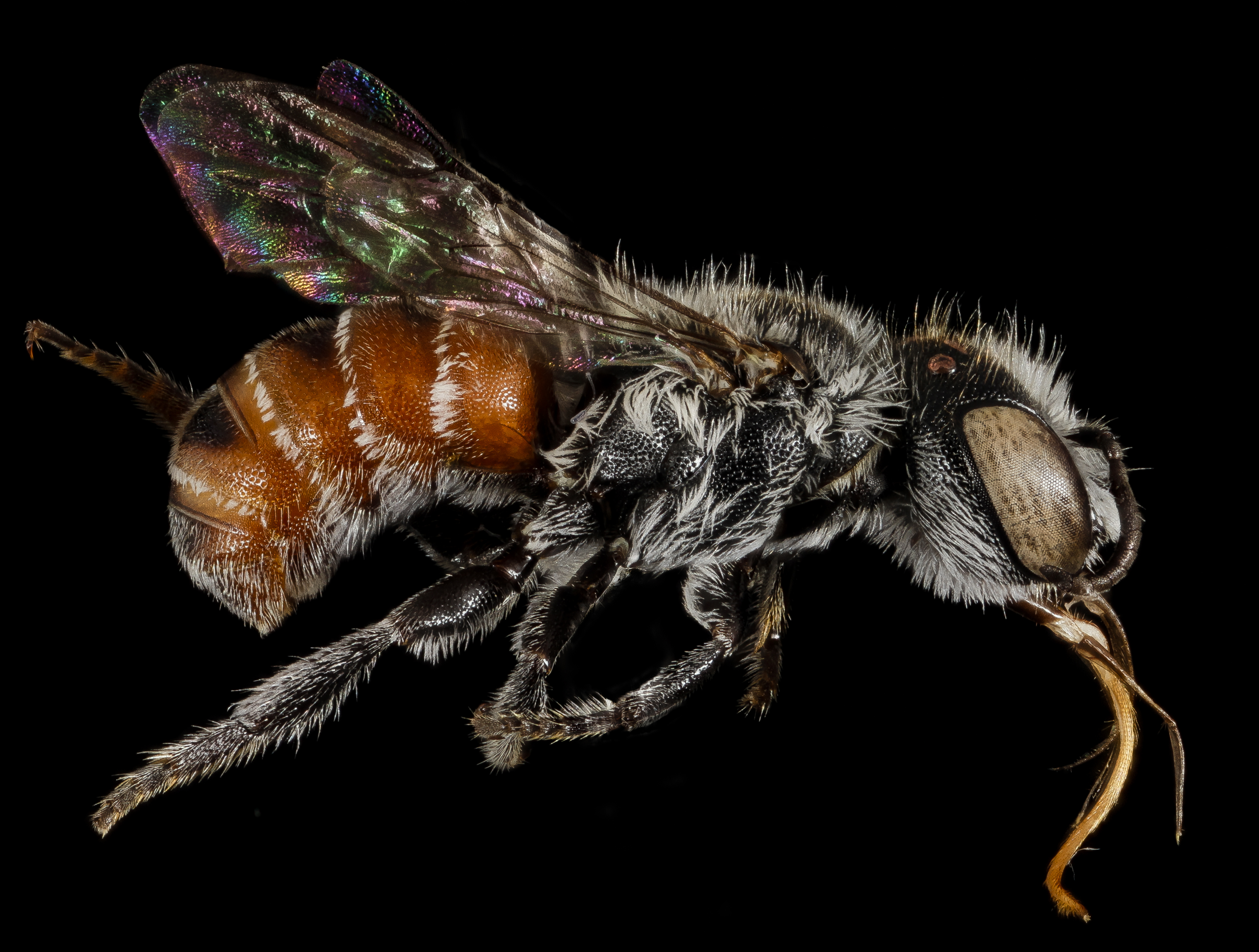

Scientific classification
- Domain: Eukaryota
- Kingdom: Animalia
- Phylum: Arthropoda
- Class: Insecta
- Order: Hymenoptera
- Family: Megachilidae
- Tribe: Osmiini
- Genus: Ashmeadiella
- Species: A. xenomastax

Binomial name
- Ashmeadiella xenomastax Michener, 1939

= Ashmeadiella xenomastax =

Species of bee

Ashmeadiella xenomastax is a species of bee in the family Megachilidae. It is found in Central and North America.
