= Ashmeadiella eurynorhyncha =

Scientific classification
- Domain: Eukaryota
- Kingdom: Animalia
- Phylum: Arthropoda
- Class: Insecta
- Order: Hymenoptera
- Family: Megachilidae
- Tribe: Osmiini
- Genus: Ashmeadiella
- Species: A. eurynorhyncha

Binomial name
- Ashmeadiella eurynorhyncha Michener, 1939

Species of bee

Ashmeadiella eurynorhyncha is a species of bee in the family Megachilidae. It is found in North America.
