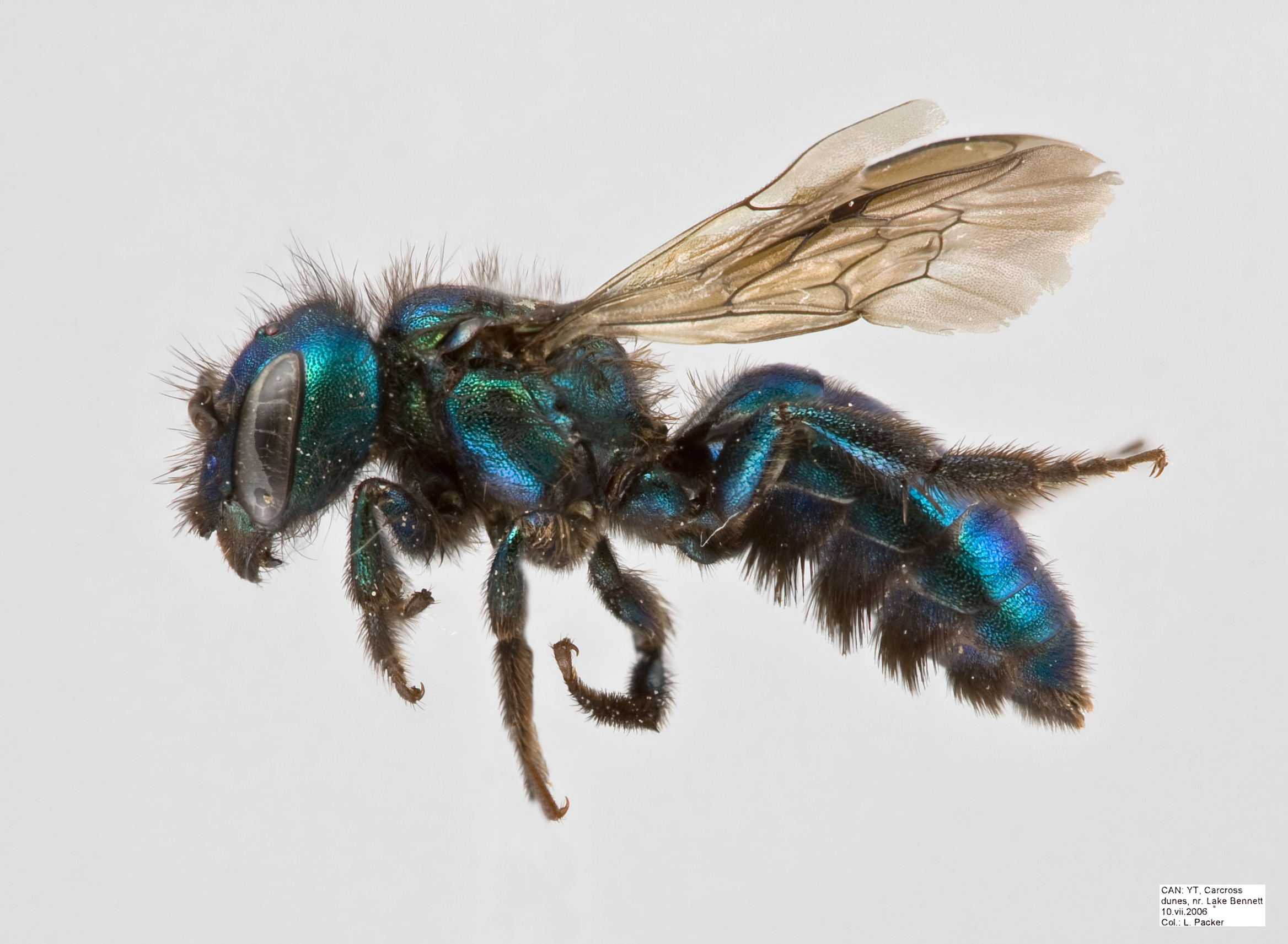
- Female H. fulgida

Scientific classification
- Domain: Eukaryota
- Kingdom: Animalia
- Phylum: Arthropoda
- Class: Insecta
- Order: Hymenoptera
- Family: Megachilidae
- Tribe: Osmiini
- Genus: Hoplitis
- Species: H. fulgida

Binomial name
- Hoplitis fulgida Cronquist

= Hoplitis fulgida =

Species of bee

Hoplitis fulgida is a species of bee in the family Megachilidae. It is found in North America.

== Subspecies ==
These two subspecies belong to the species Hoplitis fulgida:

- Hoplitis fulgida fulgida
- Hoplitis fulgida platyura
