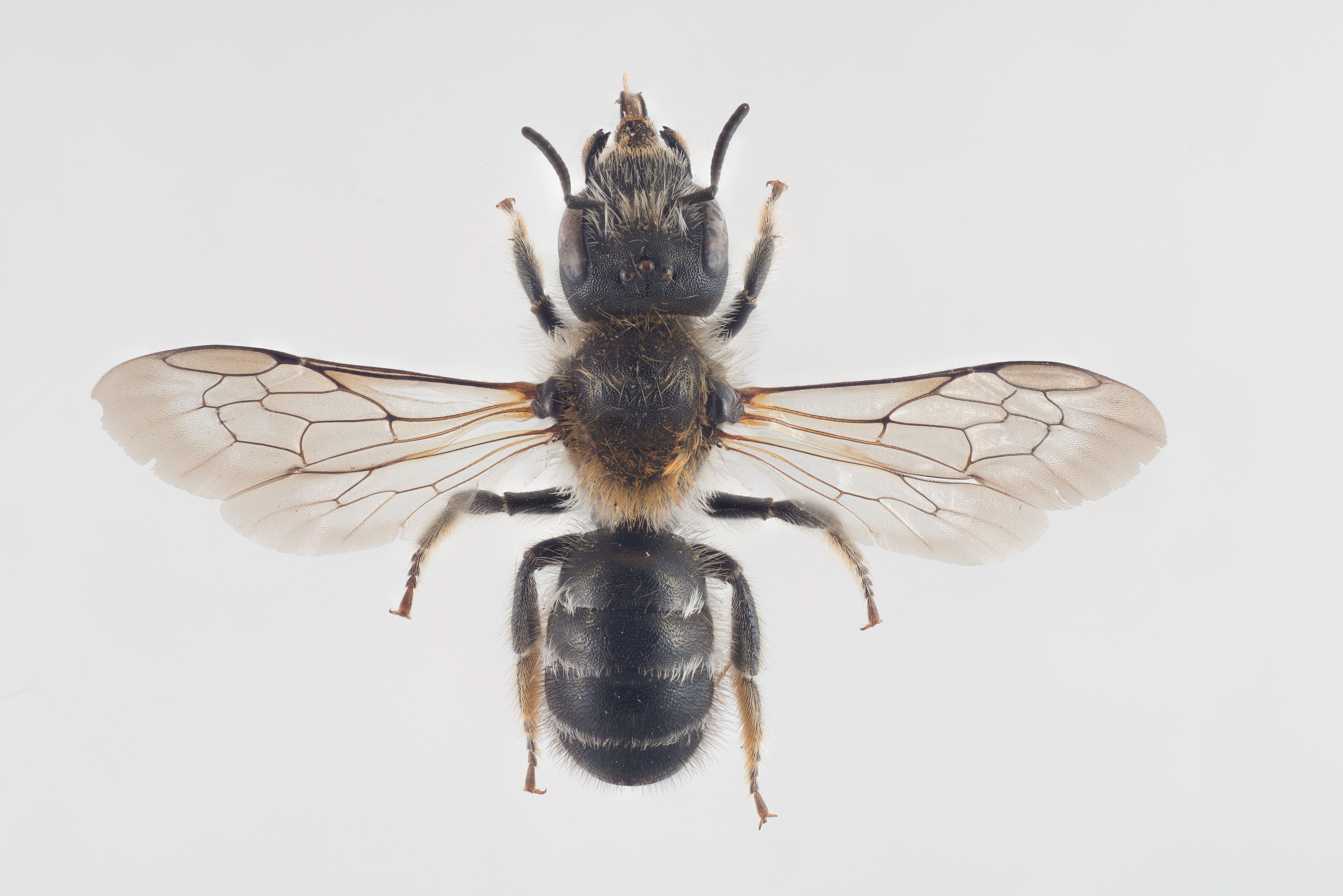

Scientific classification
- Domain: Eukaryota
- Kingdom: Animalia
- Phylum: Arthropoda
- Class: Insecta
- Order: Hymenoptera
- Family: Megachilidae
- Subfamily: Megachilinae
- Tribe: Osmiini
- Genus: Hoplitis
- Species: H. tuberculata

Binomial name
- Hoplitis tuberculata Nylander, 1848

= Hoplitis tuberculata =

Species of bee

Hoplitis tuberculata, also known as the Lundwood bee, is a species of solitary bee belonging to the family Megachilidae. Hoplitis tuberculata exhibits a disjunct distribution range, with its habitat spanning the subalpine zones of the Alps and extending to boreal regions in Europe and Asia. The species primarily nests in insect borings in dead wood and utilizes various materials for constructing its brood cells.

== Distribution ==
Hoplitis tuberculata is a subalpine species, which has an extensive distribution in mountainous habitats. The species has been recorded in various European countries including: Austria, France, Italy, Norway, Sweden and Switzerland. The species exhibits a disjunct distribution area, ranging from the Alps in France to Austria, as well as neighbouring areas such as the Jura and Black Forest mountain ranges. Moreover, it can also be found in the boreal zone, extending from Scandinavia and Northeast Europe to Eastern Asia.

== Habitat ==
Hoplitis tuberculata exhibits a preference for open forests, forest edges, and windfall areas within upper montane and subalpine zones of the Alps. It commonly utilizes insect borings in sun exposed dead wood within standing dead trees, tree trunks, and stumps as nesting sites.

== Reproduction ==
Hoplitis tuberculata constructs brood cells within insect borings in sun-exposed dead wood, such as standing dead trees, tree trunks, stumps, as well as man-made habitats like bamboo sticks or old untreated timber walls. Nests consist of one to several brood cells constructed in a linear series. Hoplitis tuberculata utilizes leaf pulp to construct both the walls of the brood cells and the nest plug. Notable features of its nest include three-layered partitions between brood cells, consisting of masticated leaf walls enclosing an interlayer densely packed with pebbles, earth crumbs, and small particles. Additionally, a vestibule filled with small particles is often present between the outermost cell partition and the nest plug. The nest is sealed with a plug composed of masticated leaf walls, enclosing a space densely packed with small particles and divided by one to three additional walls.

Brood cells discovered in the Autumn contain larvae encased in a semi-transparent, brownish-white cocoon, indicating that Hoplitis tuberculata overwinters in a prepupal stage.

== Ecology ==
=== Food sources ===
Hoplitis tuberculata displays polylectic foraging behaviour, collecting pollen from various plant families. It has been discovered to harvest pollen from at least ten different plant families, including Fabaceae, Ericaceae, Rosaceae, Ranunculaceae, Asteraceae, Asparagaceae, and Violaceae. Among these families, Hoplitis tuberculata indicates a strong preference for Fabaceae.

=== Parasites ===
Hoplitis tuberculalata is known to be a host species for the following brood parasites:

- Chrysura hirsuta
- Stelis ornatula
