= Hoplitis biscutellae =

Scientific classification
- Kingdom: Animalia
- Phylum: Arthropoda
- Class: Insecta
- Order: Hymenoptera
- Family: Megachilidae
- Tribe: Osmiini
- Genus: Hoplitis
- Species: H. biscutellae

Binomial name
- Hoplitis biscutellae Cockerell, 1897

Species of bee

Hoplitis biscutellae is a species of bee in the family Megachilidae. It is found in Central America and North America.
