= Hoplitis bunocephala =

Scientific classification
- Domain: Eukaryota
- Kingdom: Animalia
- Phylum: Arthropoda
- Class: Insecta
- Order: Hymenoptera
- Family: Megachilidae
- Tribe: Osmiini
- Genus: Hoplitis
- Species: H. bunocephala

Binomial name
- Hoplitis bunocephala Michener, 1947

Species of bee

Hoplitis bunocephala is a species of bee in the family Megachilidae. It is found in North America.
