= Ashmeadiella rubrella =

Scientific classification
- Domain: Eukaryota
- Kingdom: Animalia
- Phylum: Arthropoda
- Class: Insecta
- Order: Hymenoptera
- Family: Megachilidae
- Tribe: Osmiini
- Genus: Ashmeadiella
- Species: A. rubrella

Binomial name
- Ashmeadiella rubrella (Michener, 1949)

Synonyms
- Anthocopa rubrella Michener, 1949

Species of bee

Ashmeadiella rubrella is a species of bee in the family Megachilidae. It is found in Central America and North America.
