= Hoplitis mocsaryi =

Scientific classification
- Kingdom: Animalia
- Phylum: Arthropoda
- Clade: Pancrustacea
- Class: Insecta
- Order: Hymenoptera
- Family: Megachilidae
- Genus: Hoplitis
- Species: H. mocsaryi

Binomial name
- Hoplitis mocsaryi Friese, 1895

Synonyms
- Osmia mocsaryi; Osmia linophila; Osmia moscaryi

Species description

Hoplitis mocsaryi is a species of bees in the genus Hoplitis.

== Description ==
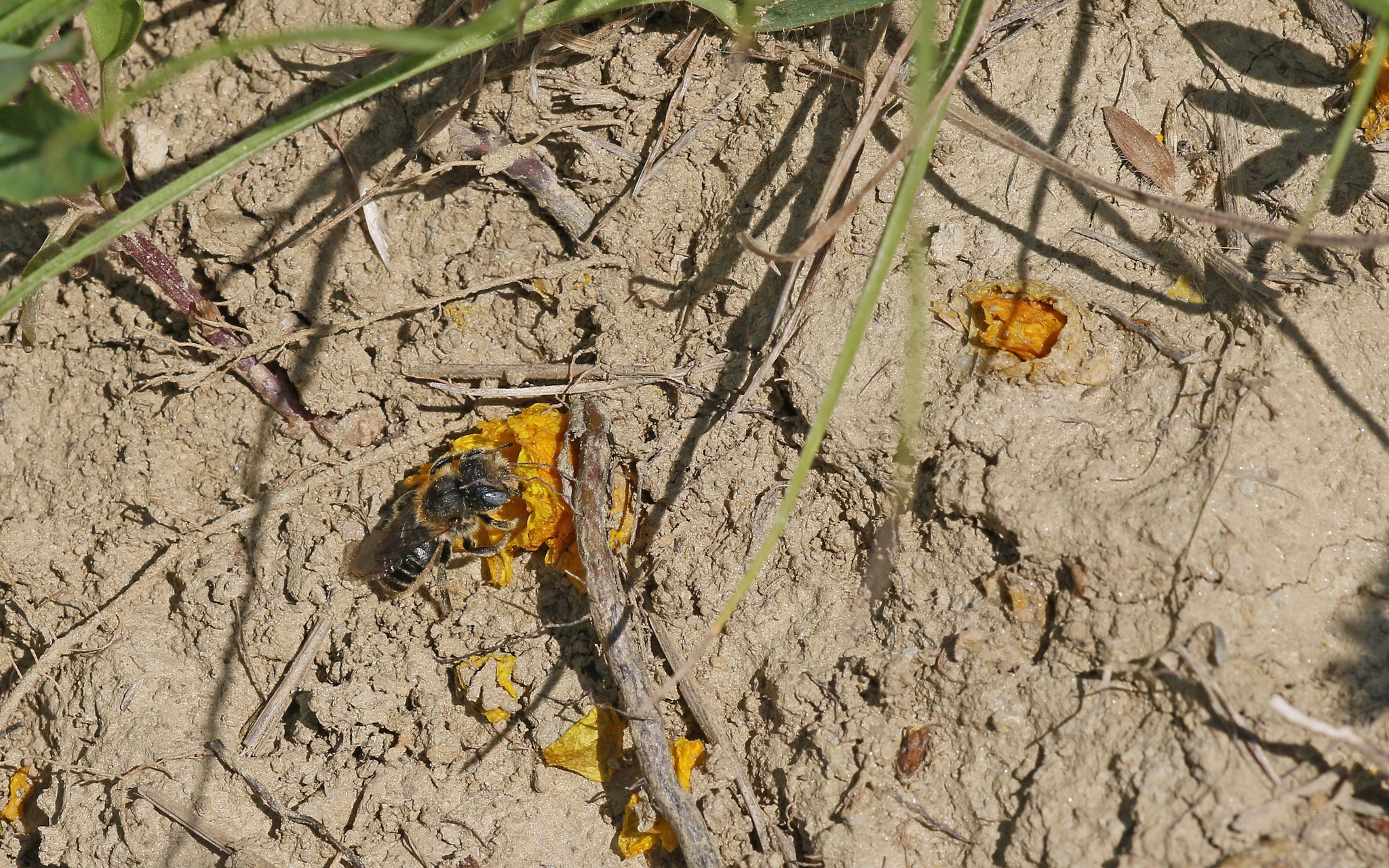
The nests of Mosary's small-mason (Hoplitis mocsaryi) are lined with Linum leaves. Guntramsdorf, Austria, June 2021

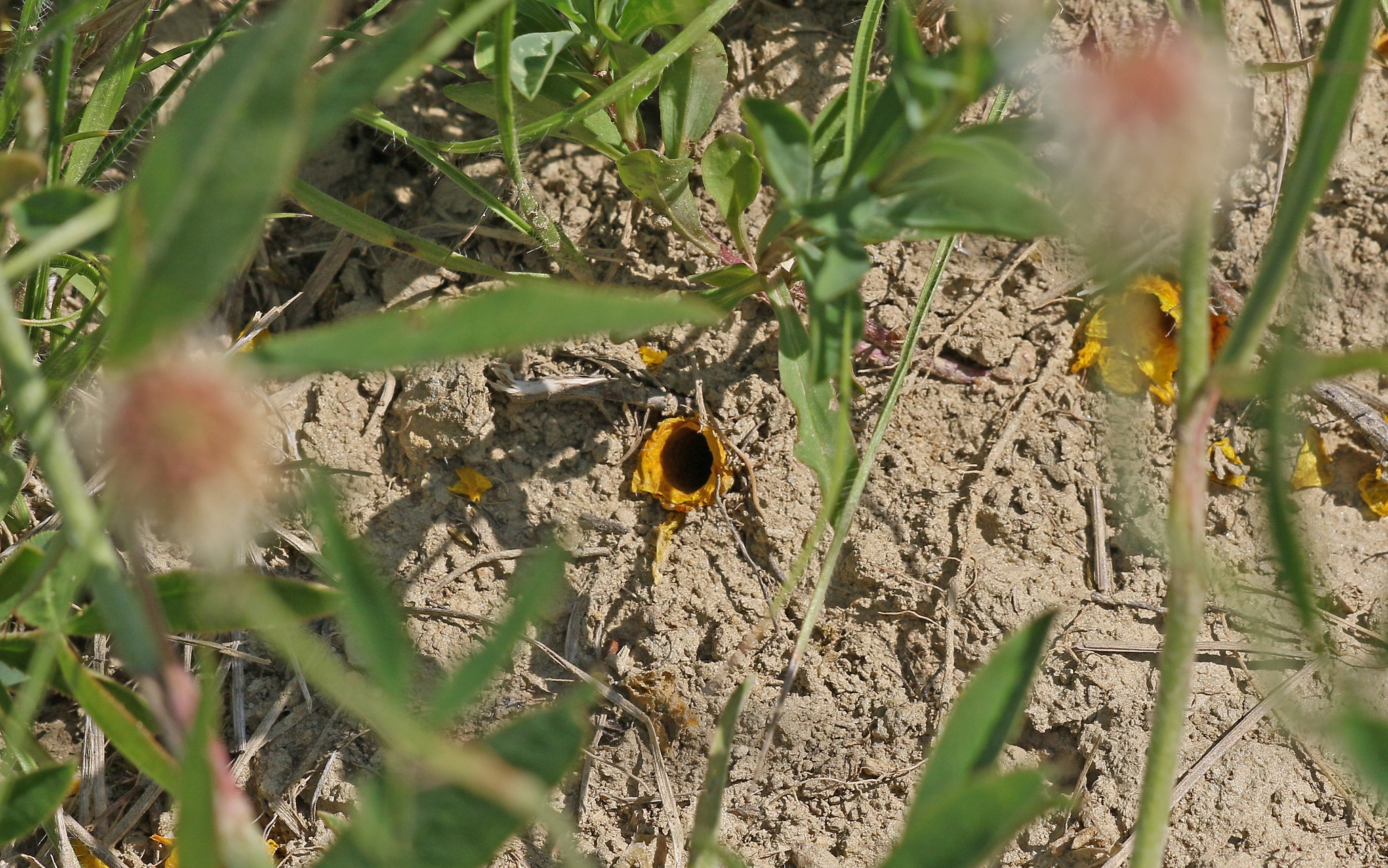
The nests of Mosary's small-mason (Hoplitis mocsaryi) are lined with Linum leaves. Guntramsdorf, Austria, June 2021

== Range ==
From Italy (Calabria, Sicily) east to Samsun / Turkey, north to Moravia, south to Sicily and the Peloponnese. In Turkey only on the Black Sea coast. In Central Europe only proven from Lower Austria and Burgenland (historical and current).

== Habitat ==
Warm, dry locations with stocks of forage plants, such as flood dams, steppes. From the lowlands to the colline altitude level.

== Ecology ==
Pollen sources: Oligolectic on Linum, Linaceae family. The main pollen source is Linum austriacum and Linum flavum. The petals of both species are also used in nest building. While Linum species are indispensable for this species, they are otherwise only very occasionally used by wild bees to collect pollen. These are mostly bees of the genus Halictus and Lasioglossum.

Nest building: Nests were found in sandy and steppe soils, sometimes on areas that were fairly densely overgrown with grass.

Flight period: In one generation from April to May.

== Etymology ==
Dedicated to the Hungarian hymenopterologist Alexander (= Sandor) Mocsáry (1841-1915).

== Taxonomy ==
Subgenus Lepidandrena HEDICKE, 1933, florivaga group.
