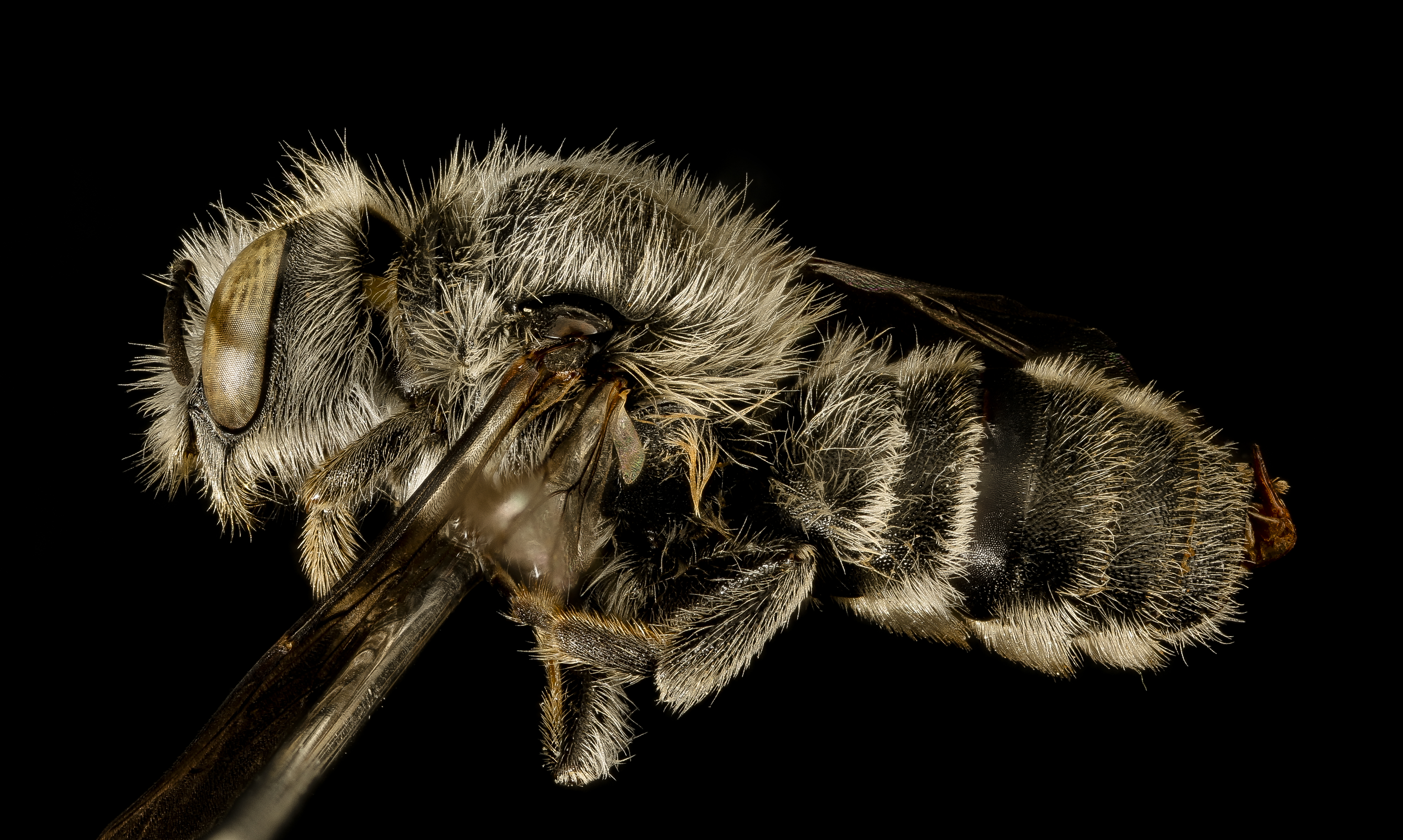

Scientific classification
- Kingdom: Animalia
- Phylum: Arthropoda
- Clade: Pancrustacea
- Class: Insecta
- Order: Hymenoptera
- Family: Megachilidae
- Genus: Hoplitis
- Species: H. anthocopoides

Binomial name
- Hoplitis anthocopoides (Schenck, 1853)

= Hoplitis anthocopoides =

Species of insect

Hoplitis anthocopoides is a species in the family Megachilidae ("leafcutter, mason, and resin bees, and allies"), in the order Hymenoptera ("ants, bees, wasps and sawflies"). The distribution range of Hoplitis anthocopoides includes Africa, Europe, Northern Asia (excluding China), and North America.
