= Heriades parvula =

Scientific classification
- Kingdom: Animalia
- Phylum: Arthropoda
- Class: Insecta
- Order: Hymenoptera
- Family: Megachilidae
- Genus: Heriades
- Species: H. parvula

Binomial name
- Heriades parvula Smith, 1873

Synonyms
- Heriades parvula homonym Bingham, 1897; Heriades binghami Dover, 1925; replacement name Heriades binghami _homonym Gupta and Tewari, 1987; Heriades (Michenerella) longifaciatus Gupta and Tewari, 1993; Heriades (Michenerella) parvulus Bingham, 1897

Species of bee

Heriades parvula is a species of leaf-cutting bee in the genus Heriades, of the family Megachilidae. It is also spelled Heriades parvulus. It is a pollinator of Omphalogramma souliei and Teak
