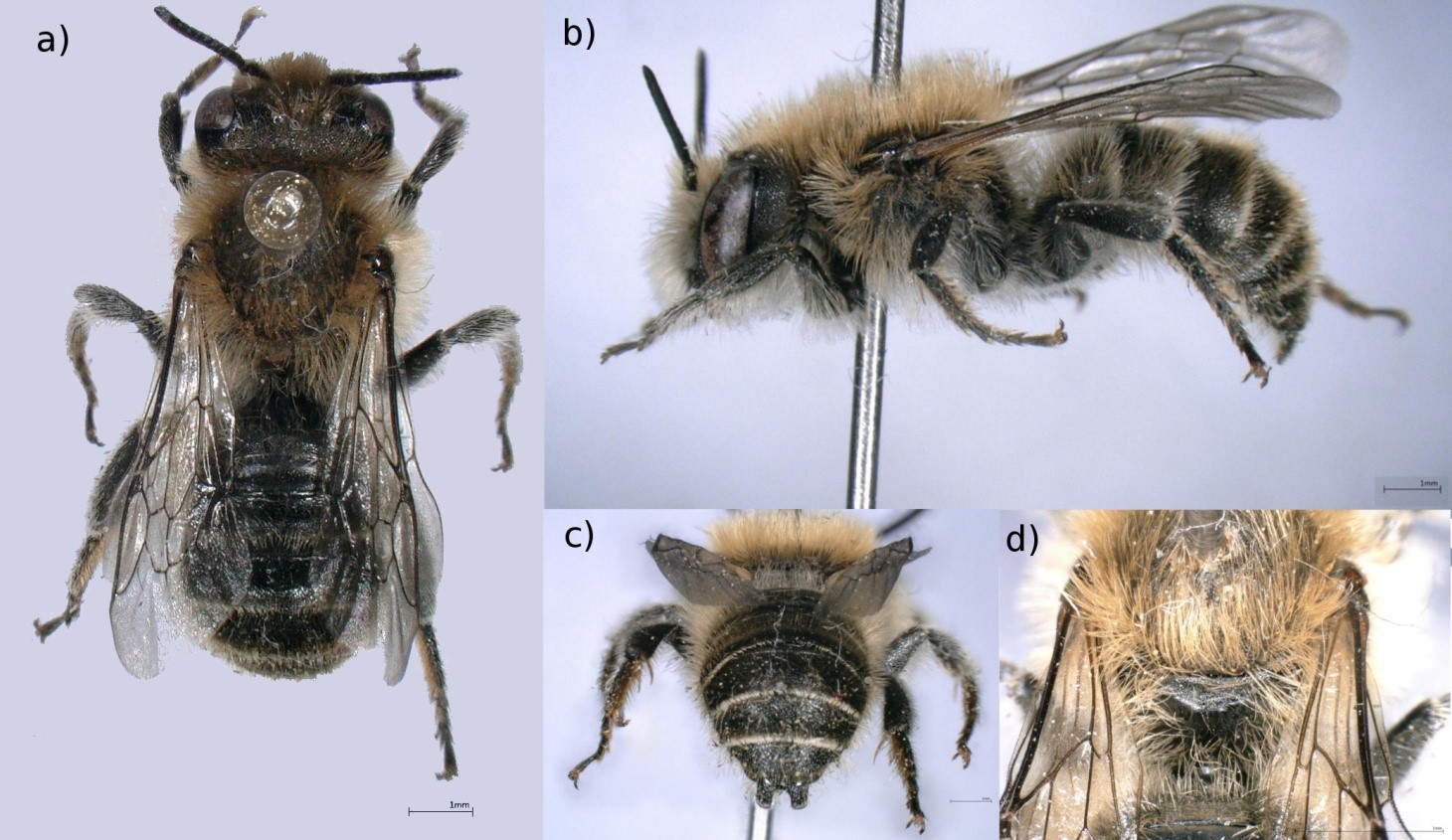

Scientific classification
- Kingdom: Animalia
- Phylum: Arthropoda
- Clade: Pancrustacea
- Class: Insecta
- Order: Hymenoptera
- Family: Megachilidae
- Genus: Hoplitis
- Species: H. papaveris

Binomial name
- Hoplitis papaveris Latreille, 1799

= Hoplitis papaveris =

Species of bee

Hoplitis papaveris is a species of mason bee in the family Megachilidae. It is found in the Western Palearctic, from Portugal to central Asia, including Turkey and Palestine.

== Life cycle ==
Hoplitis papaveris is a polylectic bee that flies between May to the middle of July. They nest in sandy soil, covering the brood cells with fragments petals from poppy (hence the name) but also from flowers such as Malva, Helianthemum, Linum or Geranium.

== Conservation ==
Hoplitis papaveris is listed in the National Red Lists and Red Data Books of several European countries such as Netherlands, Germany, Czech Republic and Switzerland. It is rare in Austria.
