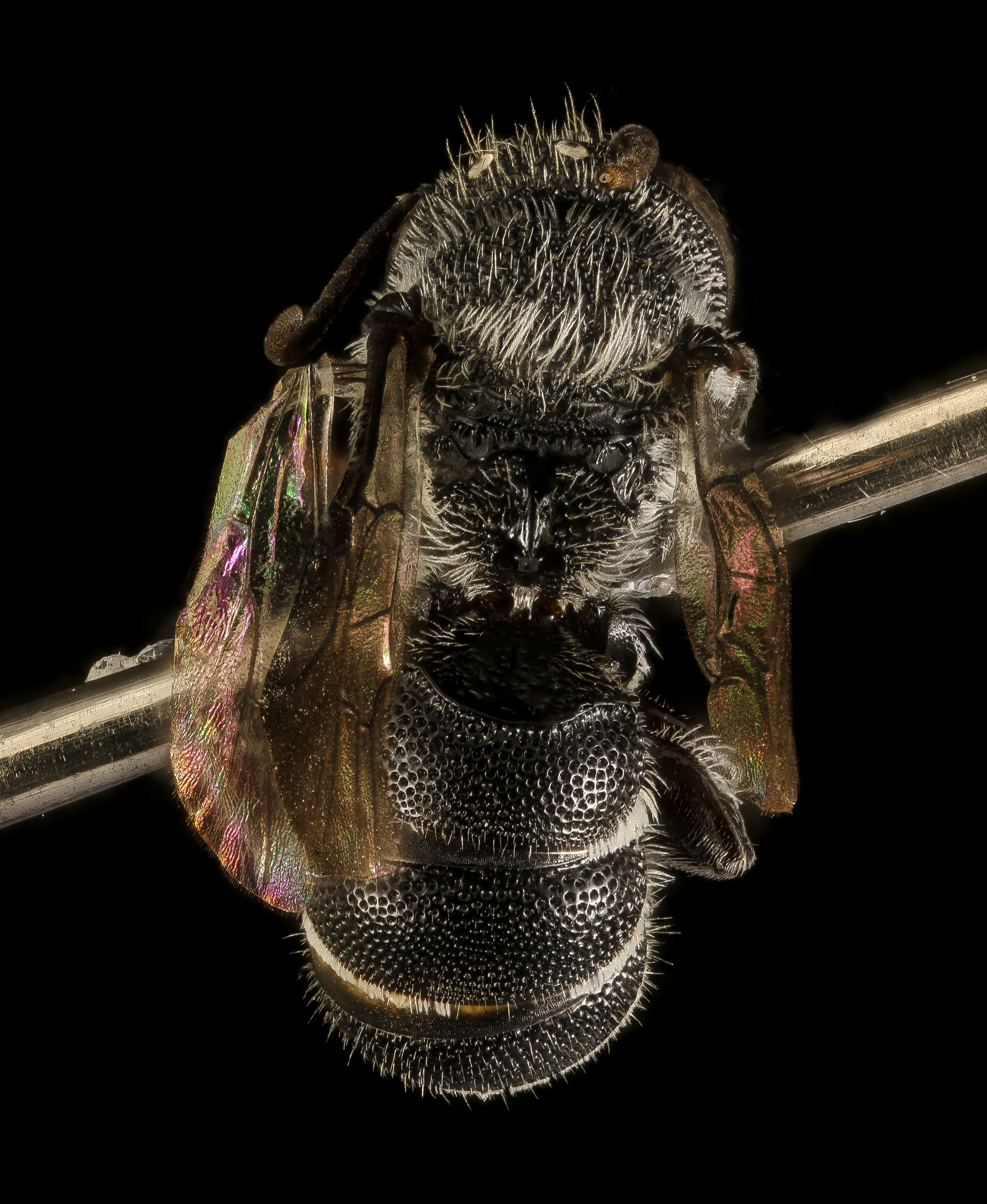

Scientific classification
- Domain: Eukaryota
- Kingdom: Animalia
- Phylum: Arthropoda
- Class: Insecta
- Order: Hymenoptera
- Family: Megachilidae
- Tribe: Osmiini
- Genus: Heriades
- Species: H. leavitti

Binomial name
- Heriades leavitti Crawford, 1913

= Heriades leavitti =

Species of bee

Heriades leavitti is a species of bee in the family Megachilidae. It is found in North America.

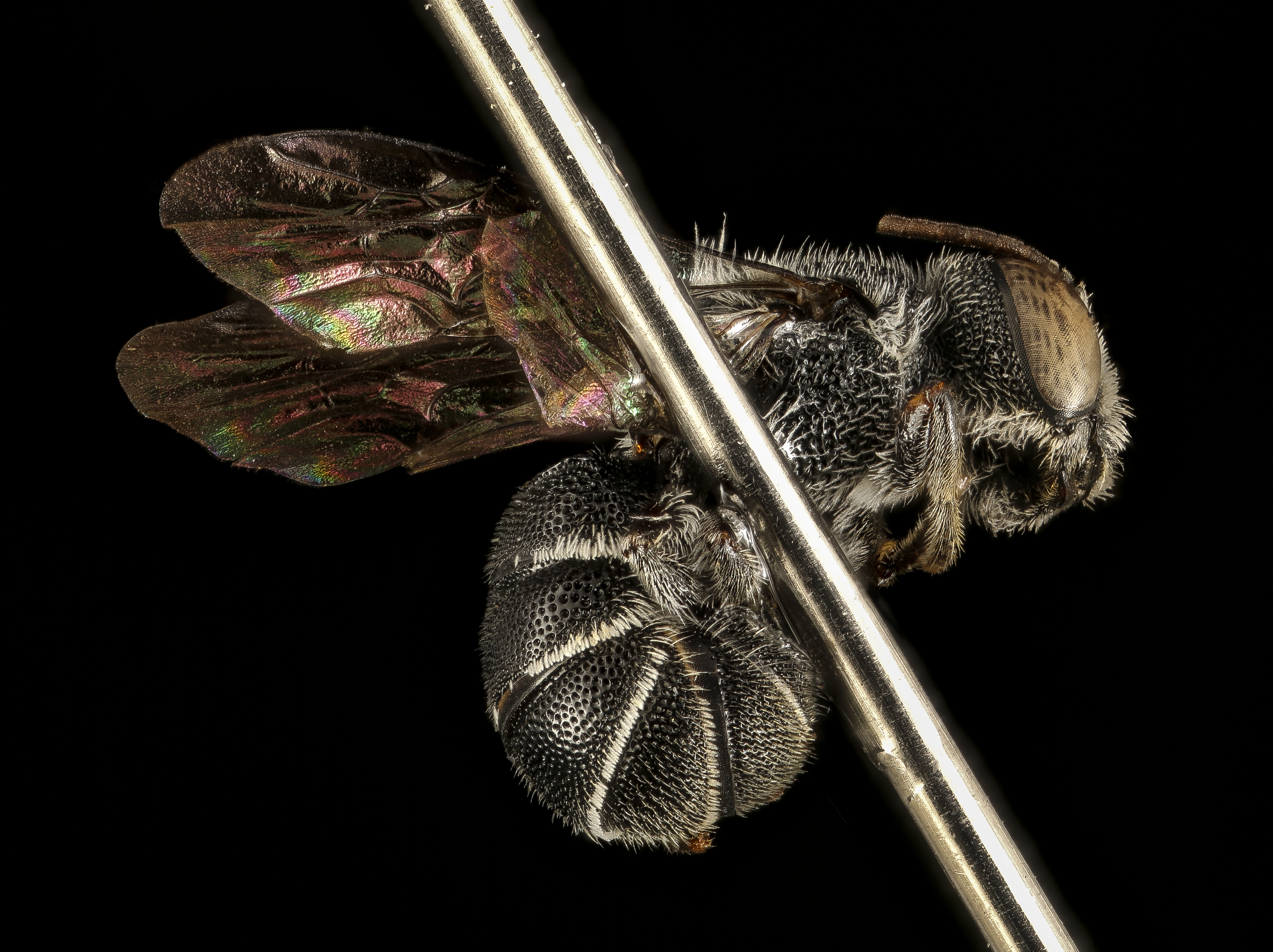
