= Hoplitis producta =

Scientific classification
- Domain: Eukaryota
- Kingdom: Animalia
- Phylum: Arthropoda
- Class: Insecta
- Order: Hymenoptera
- Family: Megachilidae
- Genus: Hoplitis
- Species: H. producta

Binomial name
- Hoplitis producta (Cresson, 1864)

Species of bee

Hoplitis producta is a species of bee in the family Megachilidae.
