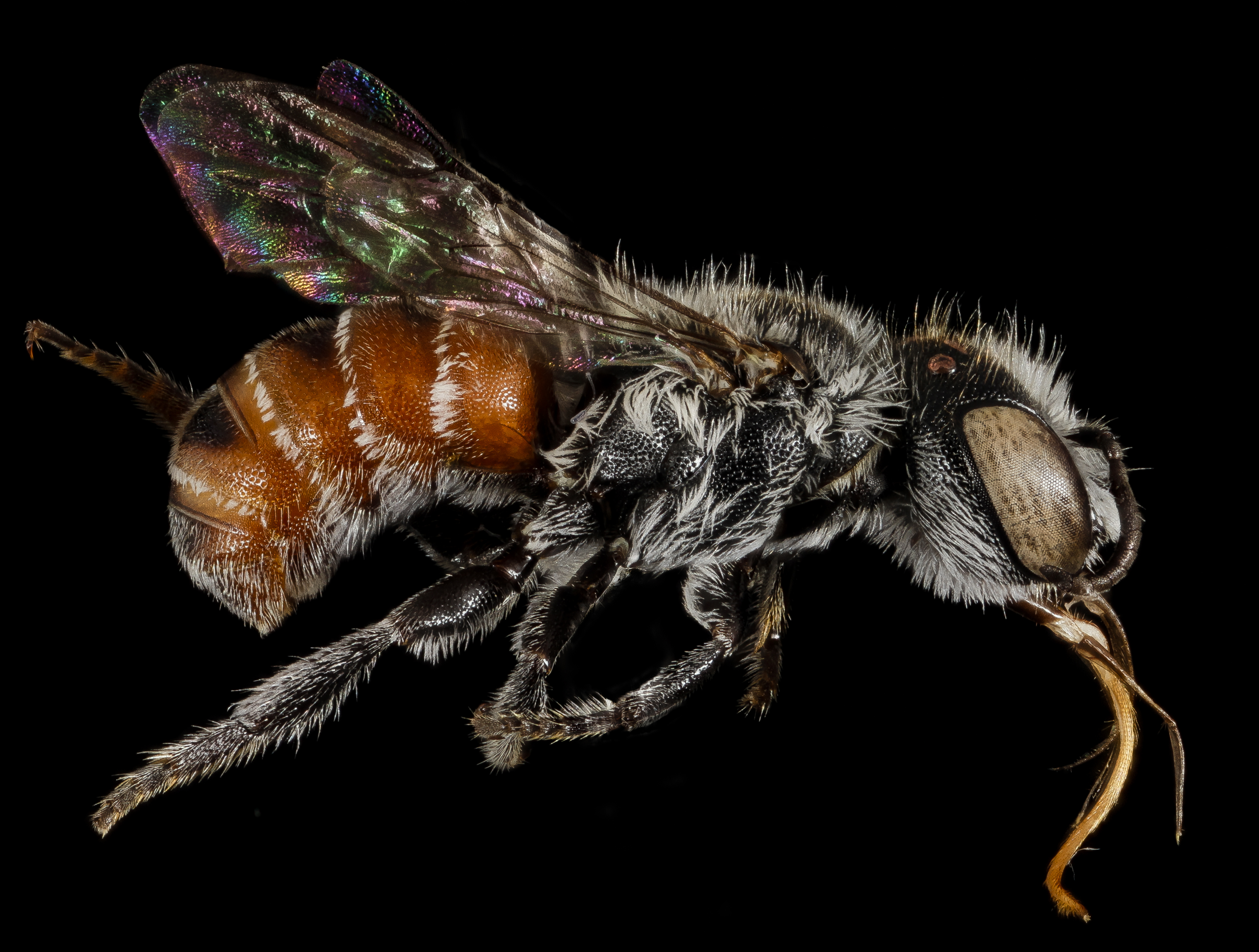
- Ashmeadiella xenomastax

Scientific classification
- Domain: Eukaryota
- Kingdom: Animalia
- Phylum: Arthropoda
- Class: Insecta
- Order: Hymenoptera
- Family: Megachilidae
- Subfamily: Megachilinae
- Tribe: Osmiini
- Genus: Ashmeadiella; Cockerell, 1897

= Ashmeadiella =

Genus of insects

Ashmeadiella is a genus of bees in the family Megachilidae. There are more than 60 described species in Ashmeadiella.

== Species ==
These 68 species belong to the genus Ashmeadiella:

- Ashmeadiella altadenae Michener, 1936
- Ashmeadiella aridula Cockerell, 1910
- Ashmeadiella astragali
- Ashmeadiella australis (Cockerell, 1902)
- Ashmeadiella barberi Michener, 1939
- Ashmeadiella bequaerti Cockerell, 1931
- Ashmeadiella bigeloviae (Cockerell, 1897)
- Ashmeadiella biscopula Michener, 1939
- Ashmeadiella breviceps Michener, 1939
- Ashmeadiella bucconis (Say, 1837)
- Ashmeadiella cactorum (Cockerell, 1897)
- Ashmeadiella californica (Ashmead, 1897)
- Ashmeadiella cazieri Michener, 1939
- Ashmeadiella chumashae Griswold, 1985
- Ashmeadiella clypeodentata Michener, 1936
- Ashmeadiella cockerelli Michener, 1936
- Ashmeadiella coquilletti Titus
- Ashmeadiella crassa Cockerell, 1924
- Ashmeadiella cubiceps (Cresson, 1879)
- Ashmeadiella curriei Titus
- Ashmeadiella danuncia Ayala, Griswold & Vergara, 2015
- Ashmeadiella difugita Michener, 1939
- Ashmeadiella digiticauda Cockerell, 1924
- Ashmeadiella dimalla Michener, 1939
- Ashmeadiella echinocerei Cockerell
- Ashmeadiella erema Michener, 1939
- Ashmeadiella eurynorhyncha Michener, 1939
- Ashmeadiella femorata (Michener, 1936)
- Ashmeadiella floridana (Robertson, 1897)
- Ashmeadiella foveata Michener, 1939
- Ashmeadiella foxiella Michener, 1939
- Ashmeadiella gillettei Titus, 1904
- Ashmeadiella holtii Cockerell, 1898
- Ashmeadiella howardi Cockerell
- Ashmeadiella hurdiana (Michener, 1954)
- Ashmeadiella inyoensis Michener, 1939
- Ashmeadiella lateralis Michener, 1936
- Ashmeadiella leachi Michener, 1949
- Ashmeadiella leucozona Cockerell, 1924
- Ashmeadiella lutzi (Cockerell, 1930)
- Ashmeadiella mandibularis Ayala, Griswold & Vergara, 2015
- Ashmeadiella maxima Michener, 1936
- Ashmeadiella meliloti (Cockerell, 1897)
- Ashmeadiella micheneri Snelling, 1962
- Ashmeadiella microsoma Cockerell, 1924
- Ashmeadiella neomexicana (Cockerell, 1904)
- Ashmeadiella occipitalis Michener, 1939
- Ashmeadiella opuntiae (Cockerell, 1897)
- Ashmeadiella parkinsoniae Parker, 1977
- Ashmeadiella pronitens (Cockerell, 1906)
- Ashmeadiella prosopidis (Cockerell, 1897)
- Ashmeadiella rhodognatha Cockerell, 1924
- Ashmeadiella rubrella (Michener, 1949)
- Ashmeadiella rufipes Titus, 1904
- Ashmeadiella rufitarsis Michener, 1939
- Ashmeadiella salviae Michener, 1939
- Ashmeadiella sangrita (Peters, 1972)
- Ashmeadiella schwarzi Titus
- Ashmeadiella sculleni Michener, 1939
- Ashmeadiella sonora Michener, 1939
- Ashmeadiella stenognatha Michener, 1939
- Ashmeadiella stevensi Michener, 1937
- Ashmeadiella timberlakei Michener, 1936
- Ashmeadiella titusi Michener, 1939
- Ashmeadiella truncativentris Michener, 1951
- Ashmeadiella vandykiella Michener, 1949
- Ashmeadiella washingtonensis Michener
- Ashmeadiella xenomastax Michener, 1939
