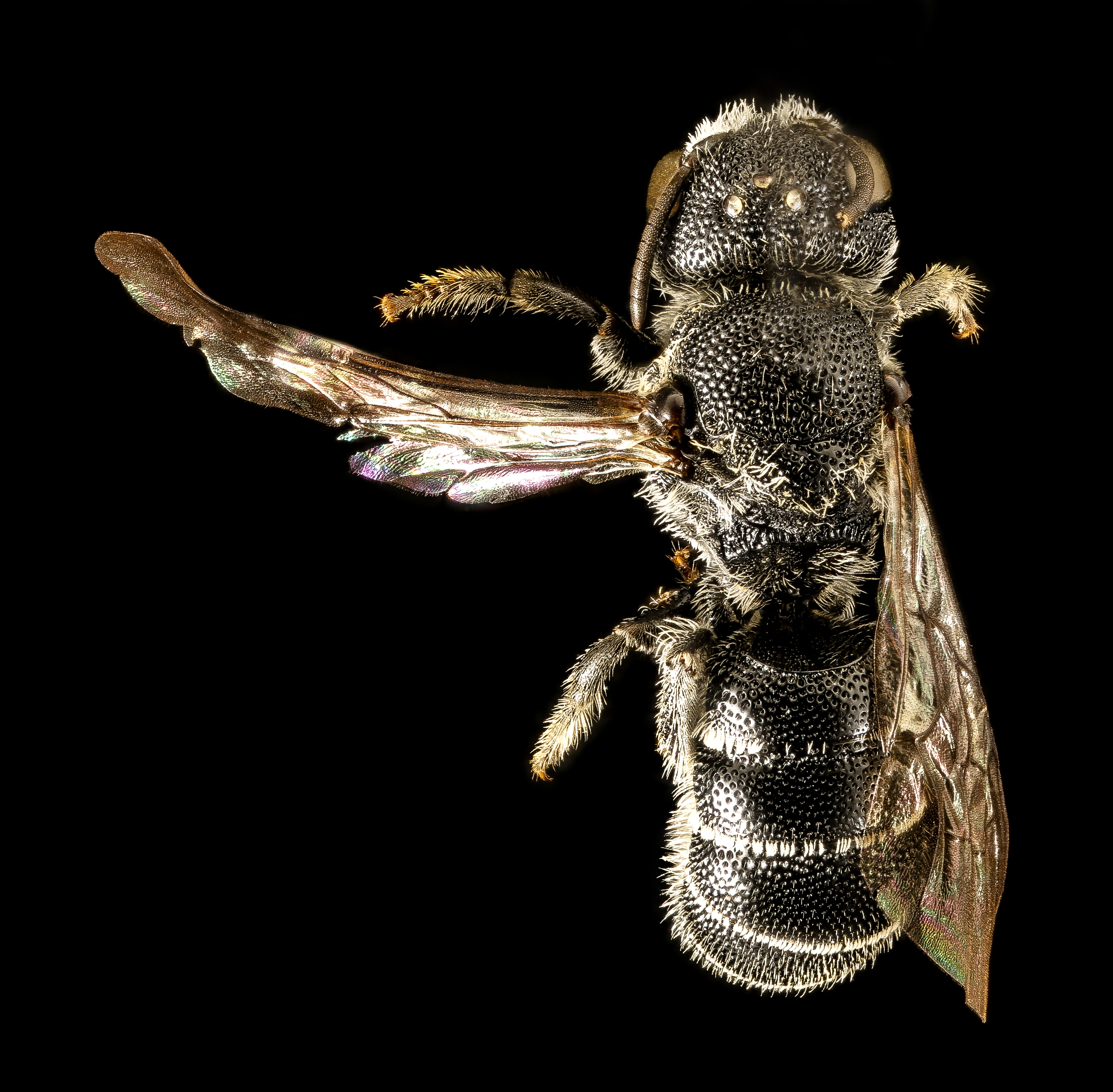

Conservation status
- Secure (NatureServe)

Scientific classification
- Kingdom: Animalia
- Phylum: Arthropoda
- Class: Insecta
- Order: Hymenoptera
- Family: Megachilidae
- Genus: Heriades
- Species: H. carinata

Binomial name
- Heriades carinata Cresson, 1864

Synonyms
- Heriades carinatum Cresson, 1864; Heriades carinatus Cresson, 1864; Trypetes barbatus Robertson, 1903

= Heriades carinata =

Species of bee

Heriades carinata, also known as the Carinate Sculptured Mason Bee, is a species of bee in the family Megachilidae. It is found in the U.S. and southern Canada.

It is the first recorded gynandromorph in the genus Heriades.

This twig-nesting bee prefers nest openings of approximately 1/8 of an inch in diameter. Within the nest, it forms consecutive cells separated with resin. Pollen is added to each cell before the female deposits an egg and seals it.
