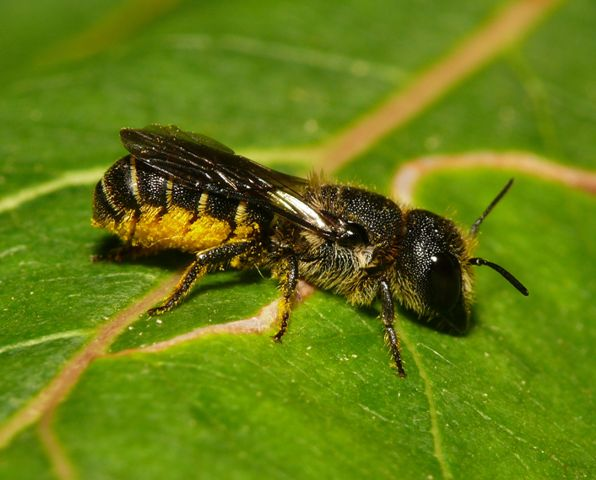
- European species H. truncorum, also found (introduced) in the Eastern US

Scientific classification
- Kingdom: Animalia
- Phylum: Arthropoda
- Class: Insecta
- Order: Hymenoptera
- Family: Megachilidae
- Tribe: Osmiini
- Genus: Heriades; Spinola, 1808

= Heriades =

Genus of bees

Heriades is a genus of solitary bees in the family Megachilidae, spanning eight subgenera: Amboheriades, Heriades, Michenerella, Neotrypetes, Pachyheriades, Rhopaloheriades, Toxeriades, and Tyttheriades. Heriades means "wool", and is likely a reference to the hairy patches found on the abdomen of several species.

Fairly small and usually black, they are found all over the world. There are more than 130 species worldwide, roughly 25 species in North and Central America, but only three species are native east of the Rocky Mountains. European species such as H. truncorum can be found on the east coast of the US. Like other bees in the tribe Osmiini, Hoplitis and Ashmeadiella, they nest in wood stems and cavities in wood excavated by other insects, as well as occasionally in pine cones.

They separate the cells of their nest with resin (most of the time).

== See also ==
- List of Heriades species
