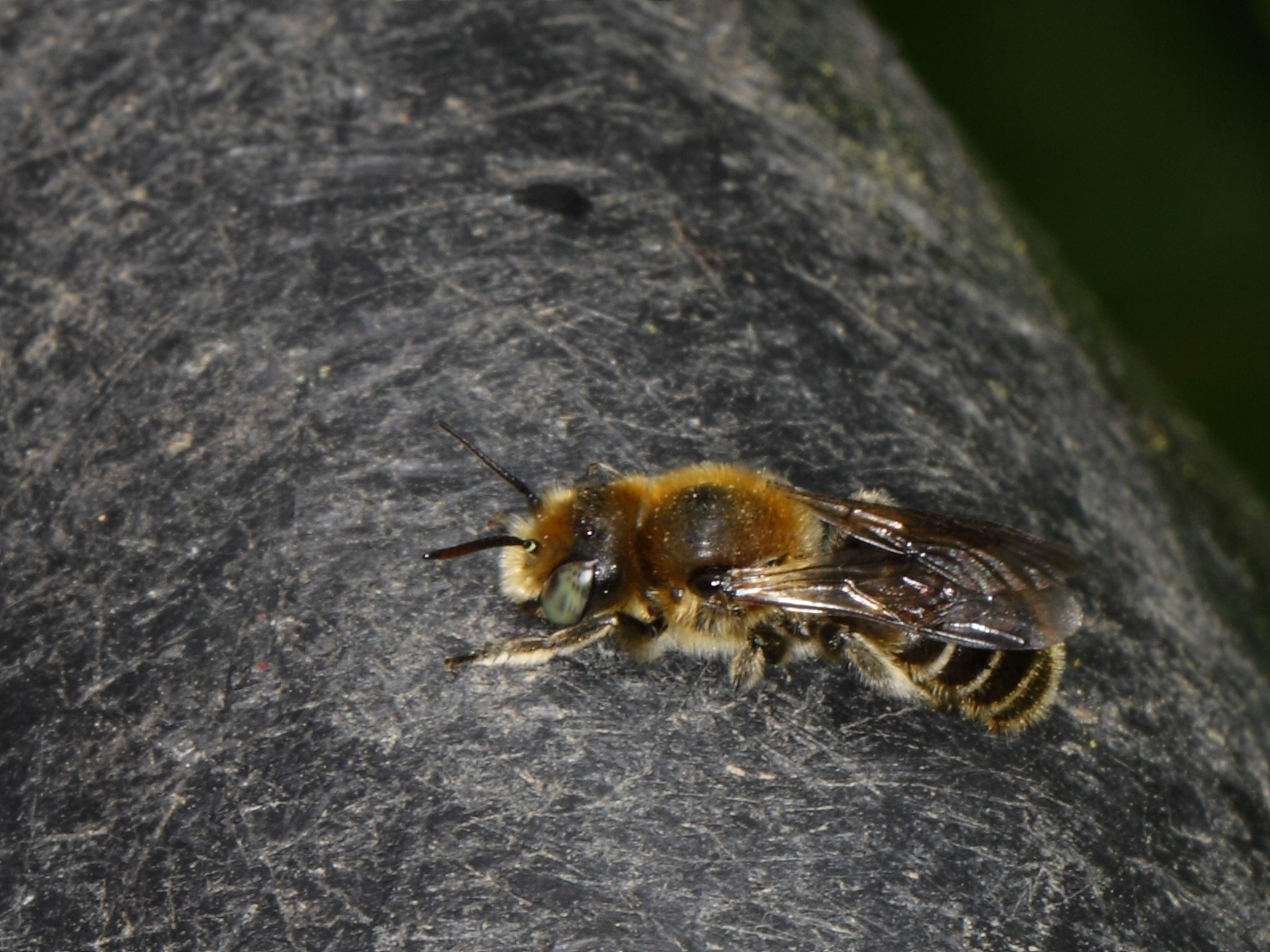

Scientific classification
- Domain: Eukaryota
- Kingdom: Animalia
- Phylum: Arthropoda
- Class: Insecta
- Order: Hymenoptera
- Family: Megachilidae
- Subfamily: Megachilinae
- Tribe: Osmiini
- Genus: Hoplitis; Klug, 1807

Diversity
- at least 380 species

= Hoplitis =

Genus of bees

Hoplitis is a genus of bees in the family Megachilidae. There are more than 380 described species in Hoplitis.

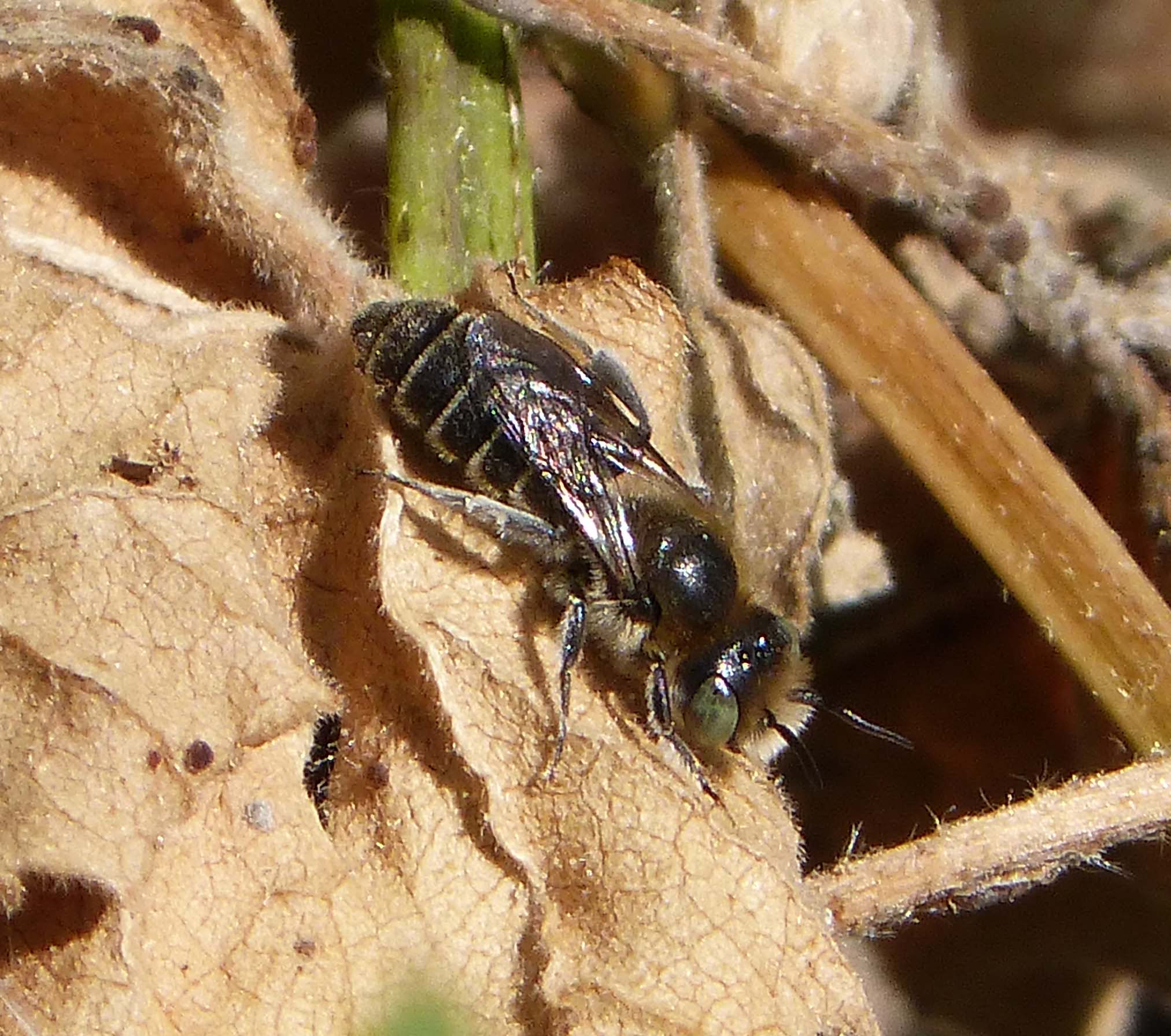

== See also ==
- List of Hoplitis species
