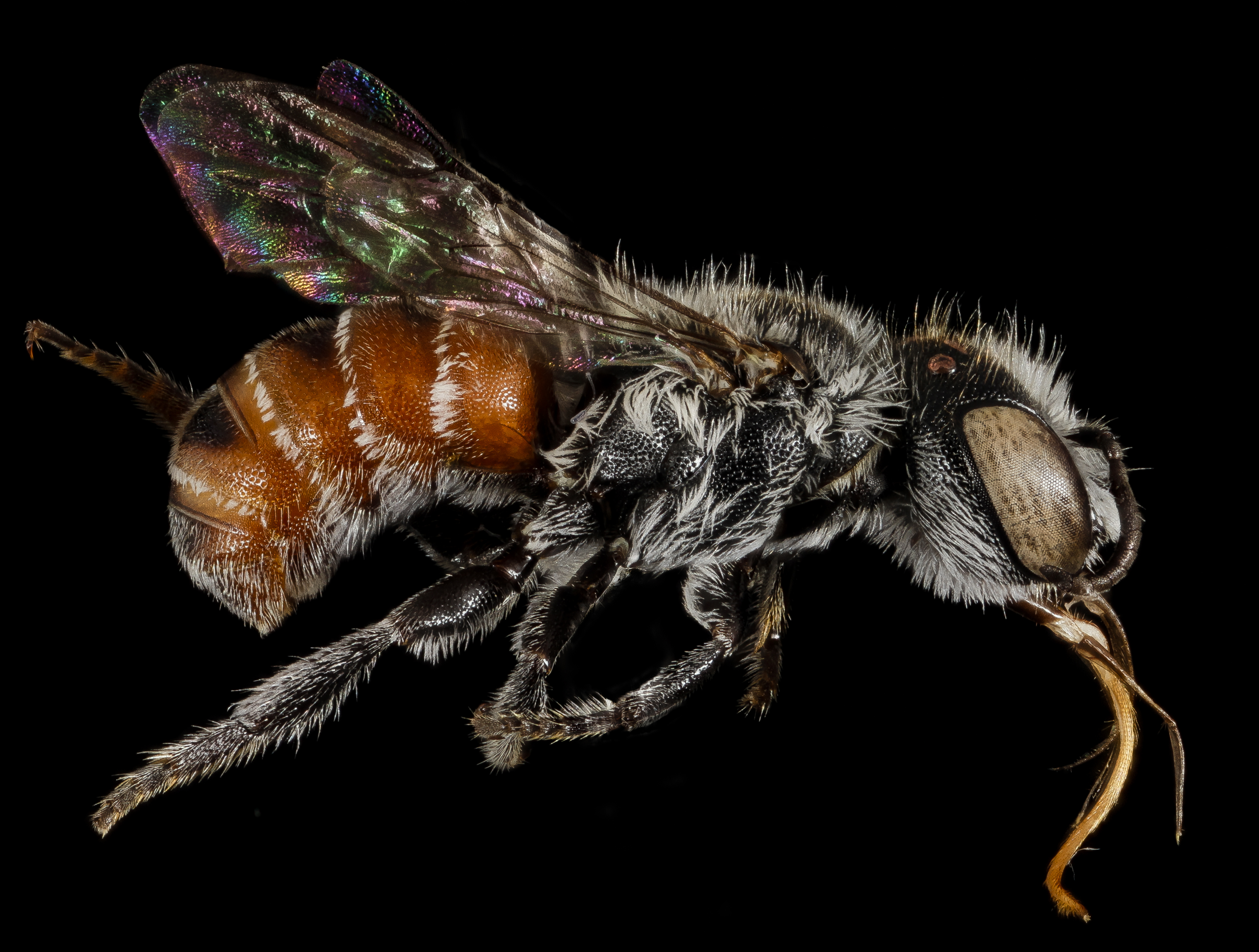
- Ashmeadiella xenomastax

Scientific classification
- Kingdom: Animalia
- Phylum: Arthropoda
- Clade: Pancrustacea
- Class: Insecta
- Order: Hymenoptera
- Family: Megachilidae
- Subfamily: Megachilinae
- Tribe: Osmiini

= Osmiini =

Tribe of bees

Osmiini is a tribe of leafcutter, mason, and resin bees in the family Megachilidae. There are about 19 genera and at least 1,000 described species in Osmiini.

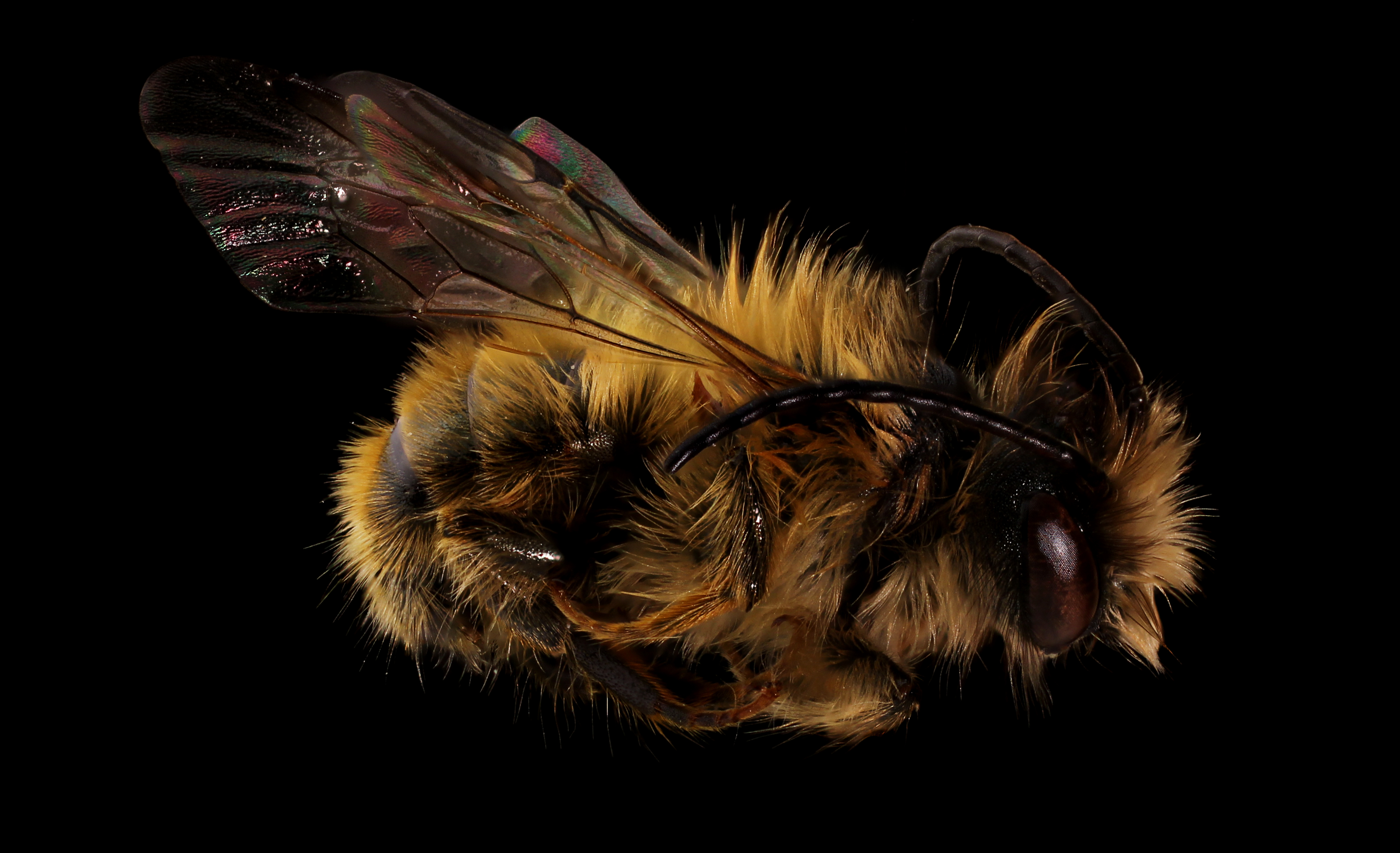
Osmia taurus

== Genera ==
- Afroheriades Peters, 1970
- Ashmeadiella Cockerell, 1897
- Atoposmia Cockerell, 1935
- Chelostoma Latreille, 1809
- Haetosmia Popov, 1952
- Heriades Spinola, 1808
- Hofferia Tkalcu, 1984
- Hoplitis Klug, 1807
- Hoplosmia Thomson, 1872
- Noteriades Cockerell, 1931
- Ochreriades Mavromoustakis, 1956
- Osmia Panzer, 1806 (mason bees)
- Othinosmia Michener, 1943
- Protosmia Ducke, 1900
- Pseudoheriades Peters, 1970
- Stenoheriades Tkalcu, 1984
- Stenosmia Michener, 1941
- Wainia Tkalcu, 1980
- Xeroheriades Griswold, 1986
