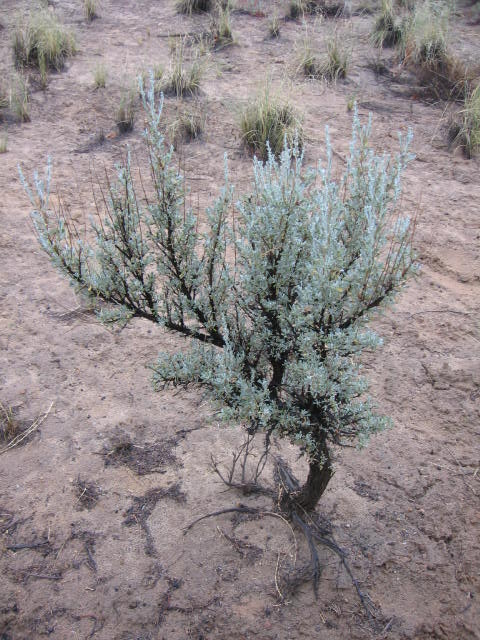
- Sagebrush growing in San Juan County, New Mexico

Conservation status
- Secure (NatureServe)

Scientific classification
- Kingdom: Plantae
- Clade: Embryophytes
- Clade: Tracheophytes
- Clade: Spermatophytes
- Clade: Angiosperms
- Clade: Eudicots
- Clade: Asterids
- Order: Asterales
- Family: Asteraceae
- Genus: Artemisia
- Species: A. tridentata

Binomial name
- Artemisia tridentata Nutt.
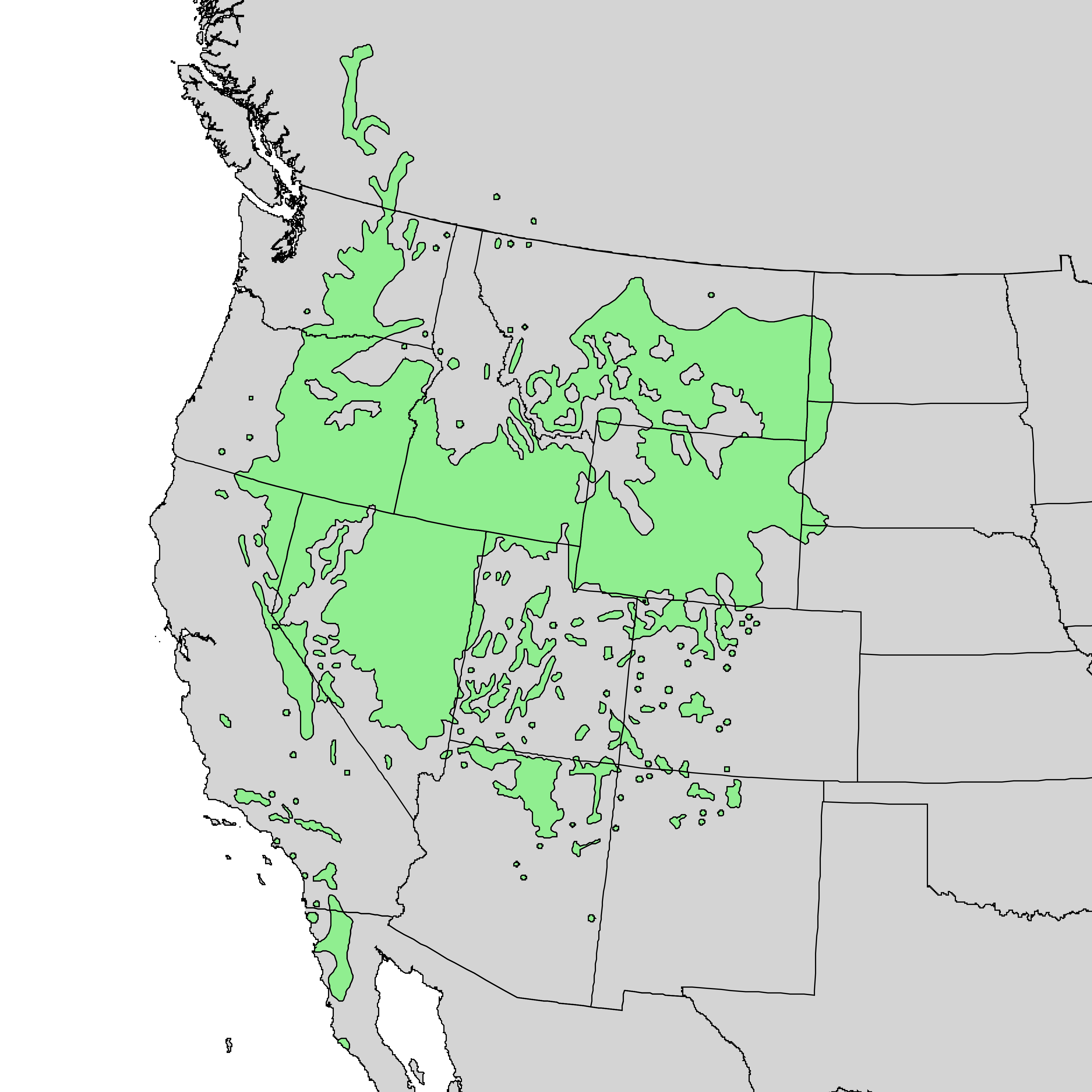
- Natural range of Artemisia tridentata

Synonyms
- Synonymy: Seriphidium tridentatum (Nutt.) W.A.Weber; Artemisia angusta Rydb.; Artemisia parishii A.Gray; Artemisia vaseyana Rydb.; Seriphidium vaseyanum (Rydb.) W.A.Weber

= Artemisia tridentata =

Species of plant

Artemisia tridentata, commonly called big sagebrush, Great Basin sagebrush or simply sagebrush (one of several related species of this name), is an aromatic shrub from the family Asteraceae.

It grows in arid and semi-arid conditions, throughout a range of cold desert, steppe, and mountain habitats in the Intermountain West of North America. Big sagebrush and other Artemisia shrubs are the dominant plant species across large portions of the Great Basin.

Sagebrush provides food and habitat for a variety of species, such as sage-grouse, pronghorn, gray vireo, pygmy rabbit, and mule deer. Several major threats exist to sagebrush ecosystems, including human settlements, conversion to agricultural land, invasive plant species, and wildfires.

Native Americans have used the plant medicinally. It is also useful as firewood.

== Description ==
Big sagebrush is a coarse, many-branched, pale-grey shrub with yellow flowers and silvery-grey foliage, which is generally 0.5–3 metres (1 1/2–10 feet) tall. A deep taproot 1–4 m (3 1/2–13 ft) in length, coupled with laterally spreading roots near the surface, allows sagebrush to gather water from both surface precipitation and the water table several meters beneath. Big sagebrush that is over a meter tall is an indicator of arable land, because it prefers deep, basic soils. Sagebrush is generally long-lived once it makes it past the seedling stage, and can reach ages of over 100 years.

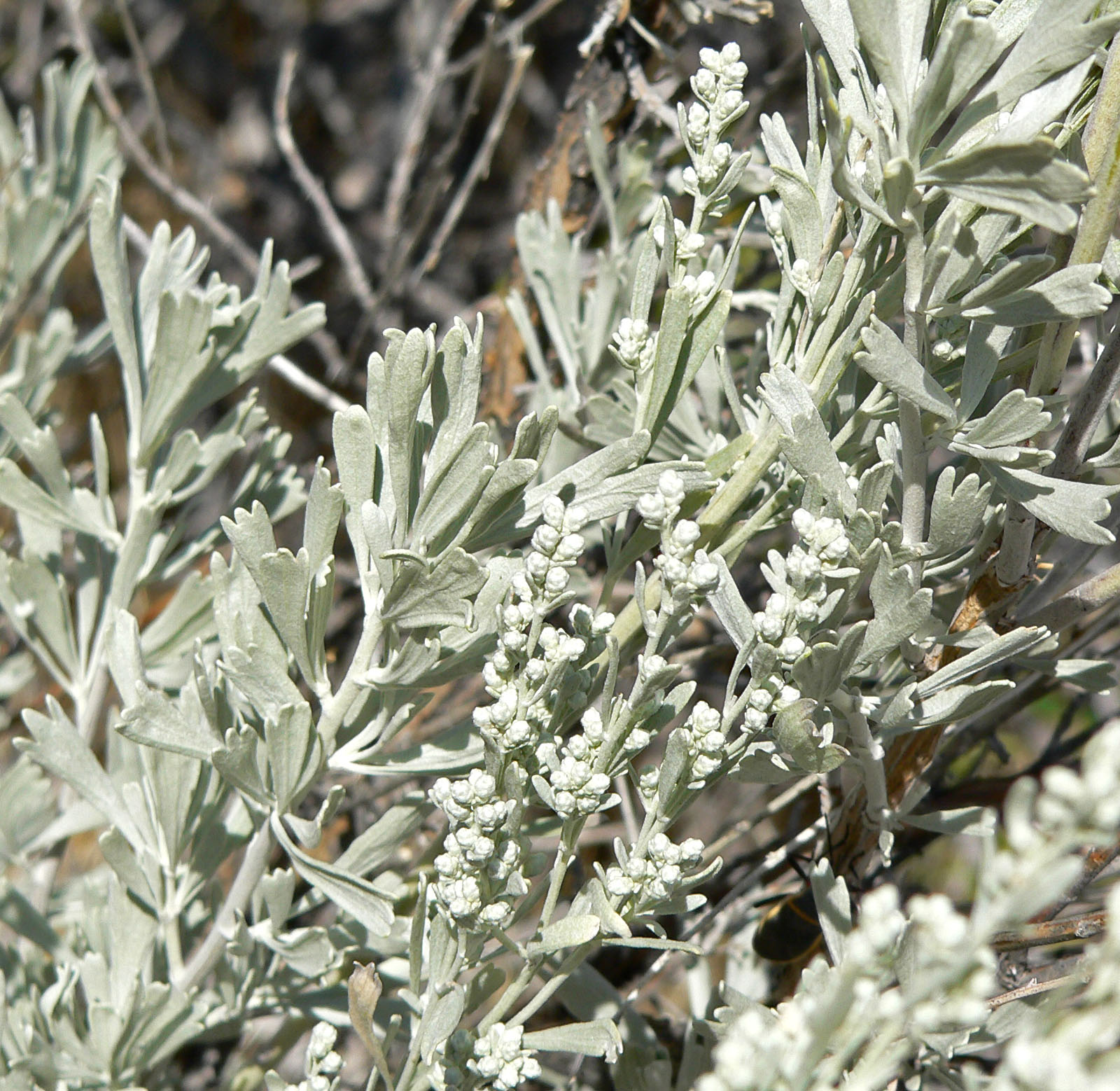
Leaves and flowers

The species has a strong pungent fragrance (especially when wet) due to the presence of camphor, terpenoids and other volatile oils. The taste is bitter and, together with the odor, serves to discourage browsing by many herbivores. It is an evergreen shrub, keeping some of its leaves year-round (although it loses many of them in the late summer). The leaves—attached to the branches at the axillary nodes—are wedge-shaped, 1–3 centimetres (1/2–1 1/4 inches) long and 0.3–1 cm broad, with the wider outer tips divided into three lobes (hence the scientific name tridentata). The leaves are covered with fine silvery hairs.

The plant flowers in the late summer or early fall. The small yellow flowers are in long, loosely arranged tubular clusters. The fruits are seed-like and have a small amount of hairs on the surface.

Big sagebrush can also reproduce through sprouts, which shoot up from the underground rhizome. The sprouts are an extension of the parental plant while seedlings are completely individualistic to any other plant. Among these two strategies, the seedlings need more moisture for germination and early survival. This is due to the sprouts being connected to already healthy and associated plants while the new seedlings will start anew.

=== Chemistry ===
Sagebrush essential oil contains approximately 40% l-camphor; 20% pinene; 7% cineole; 5% methacrolein; and 12% a-terpinene, d-camphor, and sesqiterpenoids.

== Taxonomy ==
Much discussion and disagreement revolves around the question of how to divide the species into varieties and subgenera. The following subspecies are accepted by some authors, though others advocate different systems.

- A. tridentata subsp. tridentata ("basin big sagebrush")
- A. tridentata subsp. vaseyana ("mountain big sagebrush")
- A. tridentata subsp. wyomingensis ("Wyoming big sagebrush") – Found in the drier portions of the sagebrush steppe. Shrub density is generally less than 1 plant/m^{2}, with little herbaceous cover surrounding the shrub.
- A. tridentata subsp. xericensis ("scabland big sagebrush")
- A. tridentata subsp. spiciformis ("subalpine big sagebrush")
- A. tridentata subsp. parishii ("Parish's big sagebrush")

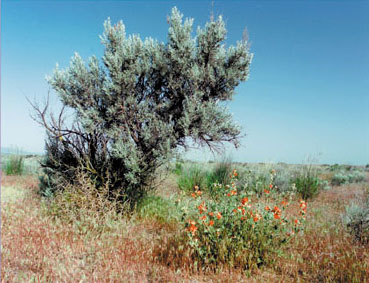
Eastern Washington

== Distribution and habitat ==
Artemisia tridentata grows in arid and semi-arid conditions, throughout the Intermountain West of North America. Sagebrush is not a desert plant, but rather a resident of the steppe, in areas that receive 18–40 cm (7–15 1/2 in) of annual precipitation. Big sagebrush and other Artemisia species are the dominant plants across large portions of the Great Basin, covering some 422,000 square miles (1,090,000 square kilometres) in 11 western U.S. states and Canadian provinces. The range extends northward through British Columbia's southern interior, south into Baja California, and east into the western Great Plains of New Mexico, Colorado, Nebraska, and the Dakotas.

== Ecology ==
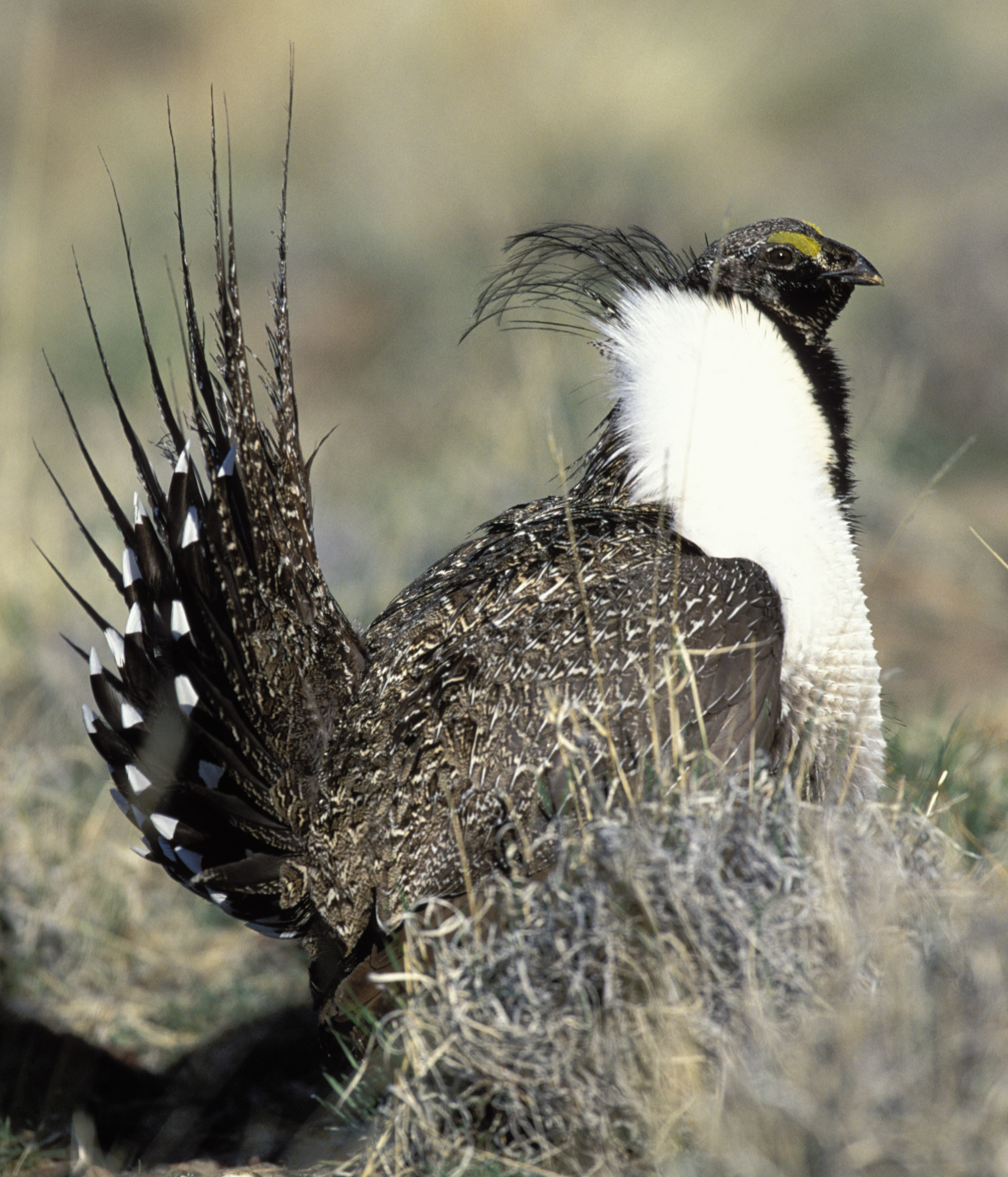
Sage grouse

Sagebrush provides food and habitat for a variety of animal species, such as sage grouse, pronghorn, gray vireo, pygmy rabbit, and mule deer. It is especially important to game animals during the winter. Sagebrush also creates habitat for many species of grasses and herbs. Besides providing shade and shelter from the wind, the long taproot of sagebrush draws water up from deep in the soil, some of which becomes available to these surrounding shallow-rooted plants.

The terpenoid compounds in big sagebrush are thought to ward off herbivores. These oils, at high concentrations, are toxic to the symbiotic bacteria in the rumen of some ruminants like deer and cattle. Pronghorn are the only large herbivore to browse sagebrush extensively. Damage to sagebrush plants caused by grazing herbivores results in the release of volatile chemicals, which are used to signal a warning to nearby plants, so that they can increase the production of repellent chemical compounds. This plant-to-plant communication can take place at distances of up to 60 cm (23 1/2 in).

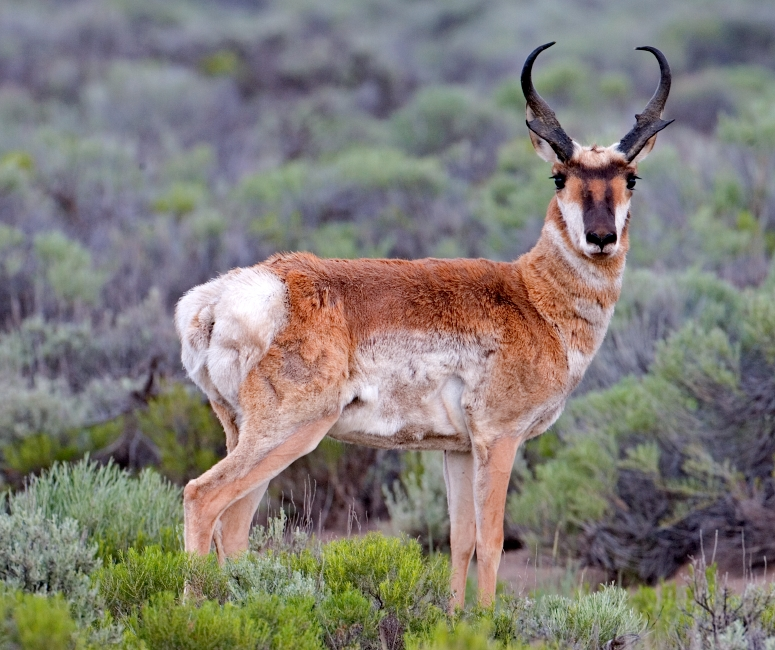
Pronghorn are the only large herbivores who browse on sagebrush extensively.

Several major threats exist to sage brush ecosystems, including human settlements, conversion to agricultural land, invasive plant species, wildfires, and climate change. Due to large periods of time where sagebrush was the primary shrub, many species have become adapted to this habitat. The burning of the shrubs leads to habitat loss of many species and can be very detrimental to the ecosystem as a whole. Furthermore, the destruction of native grasses and forbs by grazing and fire creates conditions where invasive plants colonize the area. The invasive species which has destroyed the largest amount of sagebrush habitat is cheatgrass (Bromus tectorum). Since its accidental introduction in the 1890s, cheatgrass has radically altered the native shrub ecosystem by replacing indigenous vegetation, and by creating a fire cycle that is too frequent to allow sagebrush to re-establish itself. Sagebrush lacks fire tolerance and relies on wind-blown seeds from outside the burned area for re-establishment. Some tree species have also encroached on big sagebrush habitat. For example, in the late 20th century, Abies concolor (white fir) was out-competing big sagebrush in Warner Mountains in California.

=== Galls ===
This species is host to the following insect induced galls:

- Eutreta diana fly bud gall
- Eutreta divisa fly bud gall
- Eutreta oregona fly bud gall
- Eutreta pollinosa fly bud? gall
- Oxyna aterrima fly bud gall
- Rhopalomyia (ampullaria, anthoides, brevibulla, calvipomum, conica, cramboides, culmata, florella, gossypina, hirticaulis, hirtipomum, lignea, lignitubus, mammilla, medusa, medusirrasa, nucula, obovata, occidentalis, pomum, rugosa, tridentatae, tubulus, tumidibulla, tumidicaulis) Various gall midges.

external link to gallformers

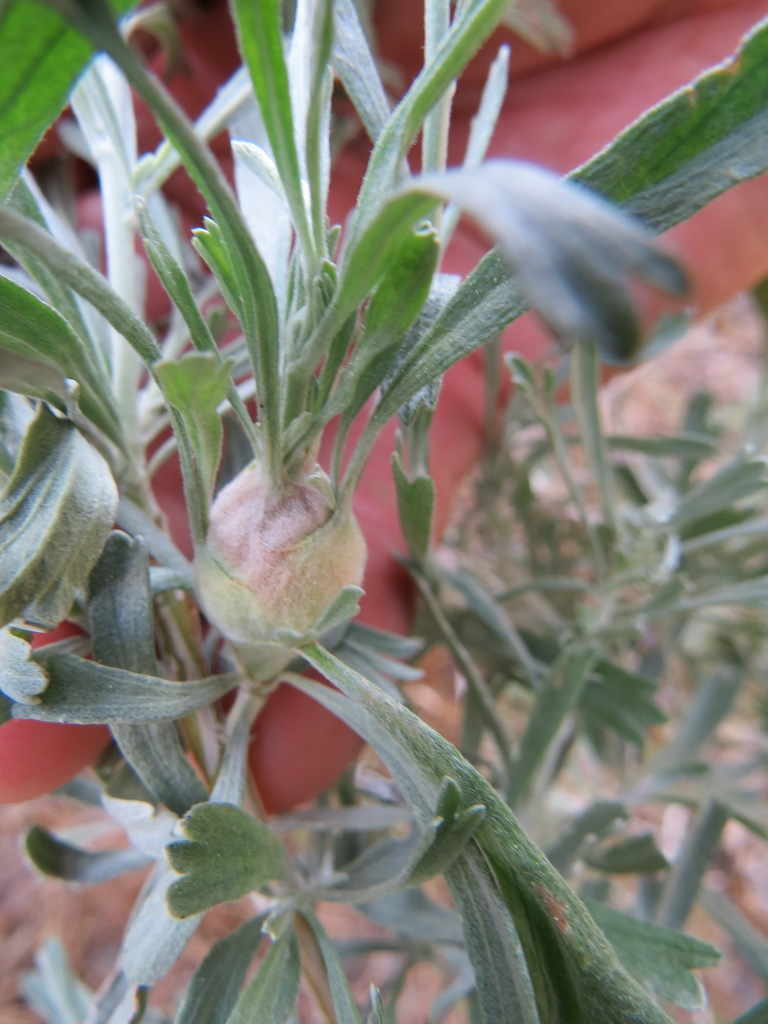
Eutreta diana

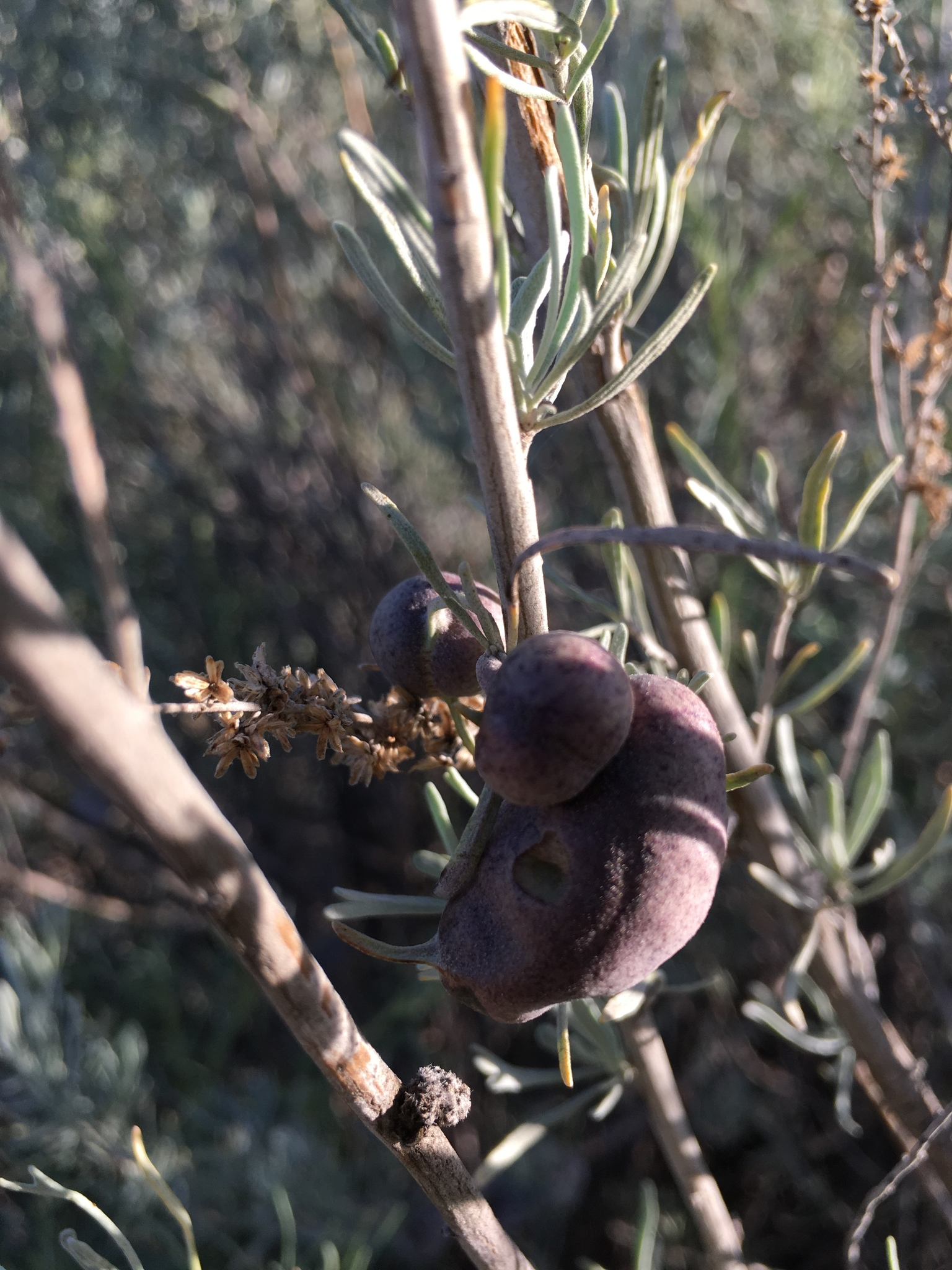
Rhopalomyia calvipomum

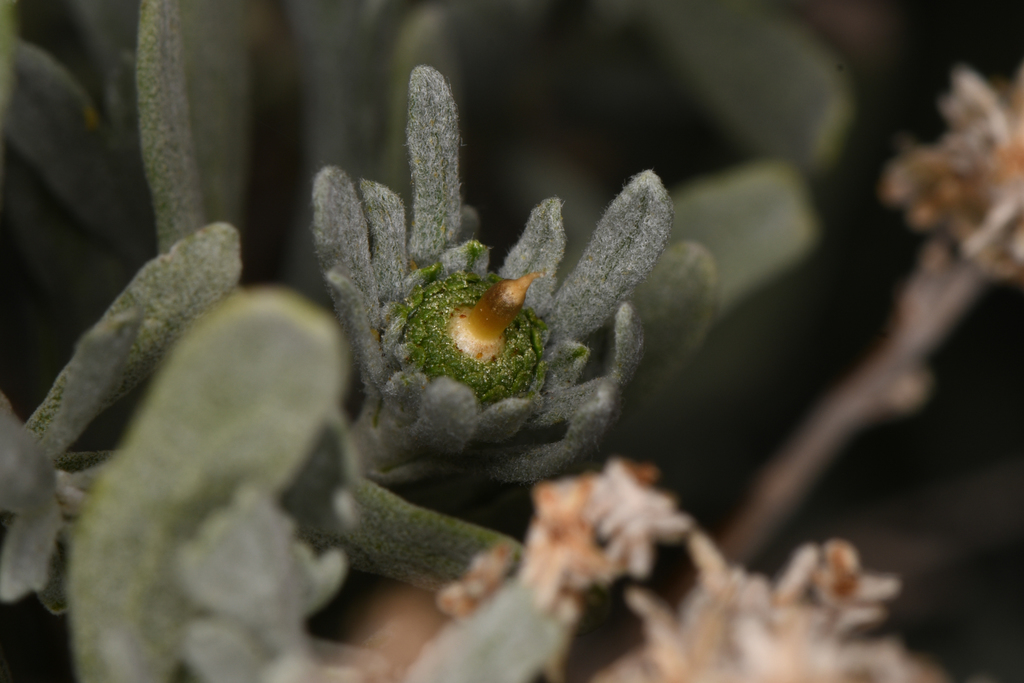
Rhopalomyia conica

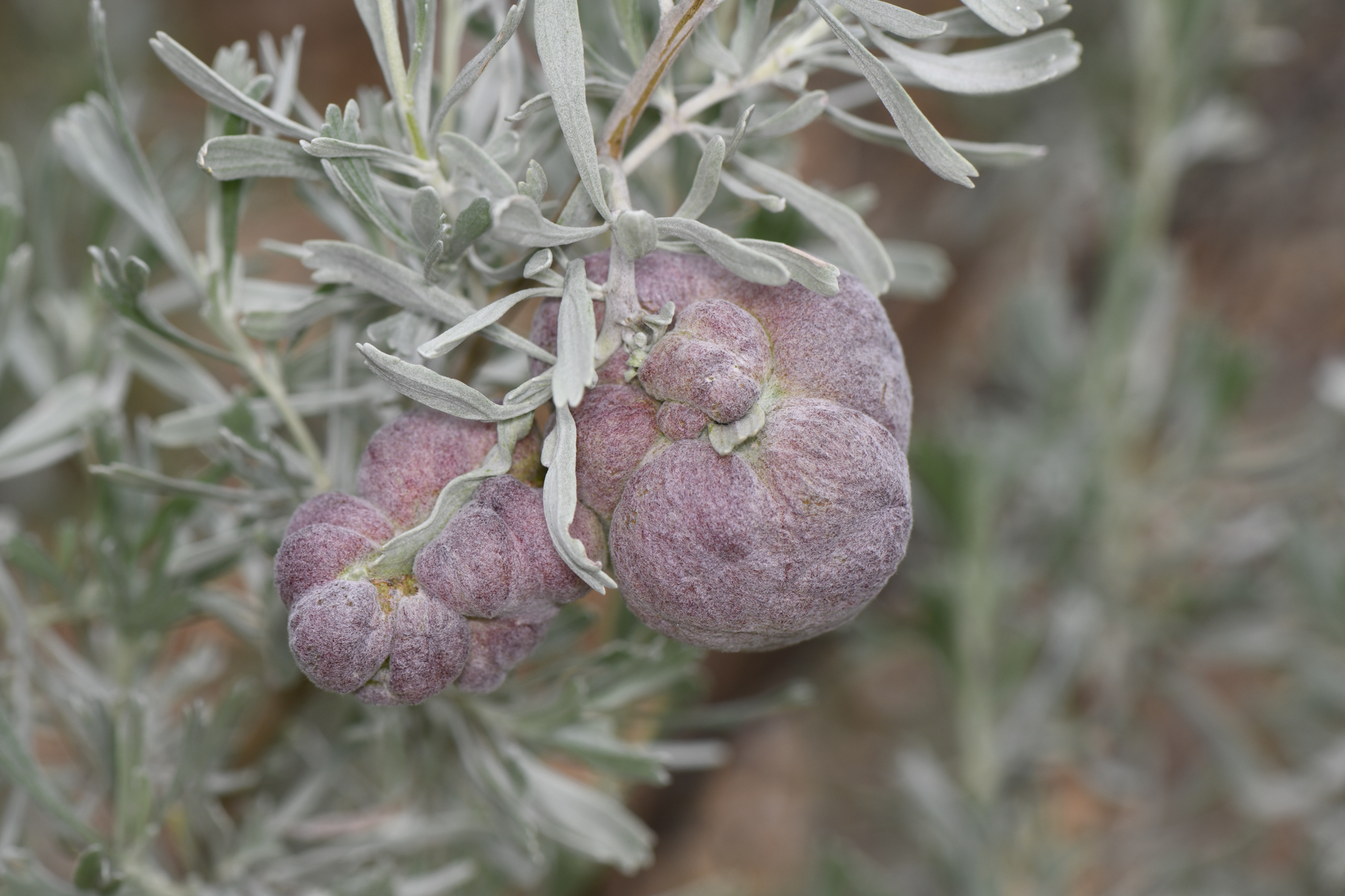
Rhopalomyia pomum

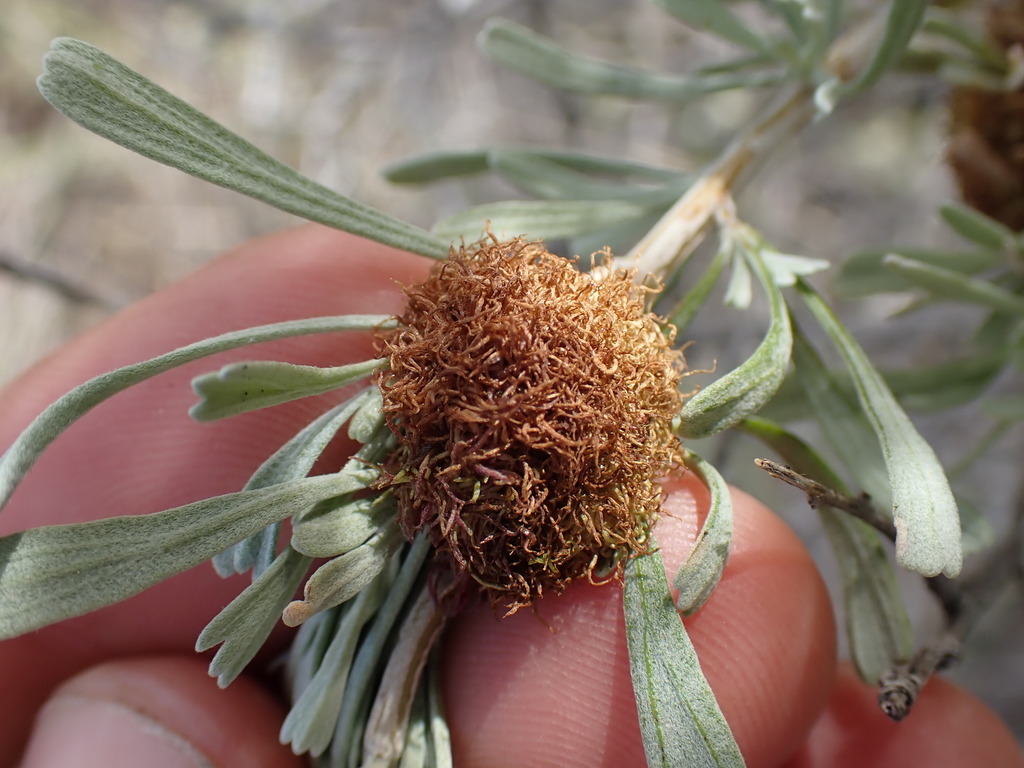
Rhopalomyia medusa

== Uses ==
The Cahuilla used to gather large quantities of sagebrush seed and grind it to make flour. The main modern use is as firewood, with the wood's oils being particularly flammable.

=== Medicinal ===
The plant's active medicinal constituents include camphor, terpenoids, and tannins.

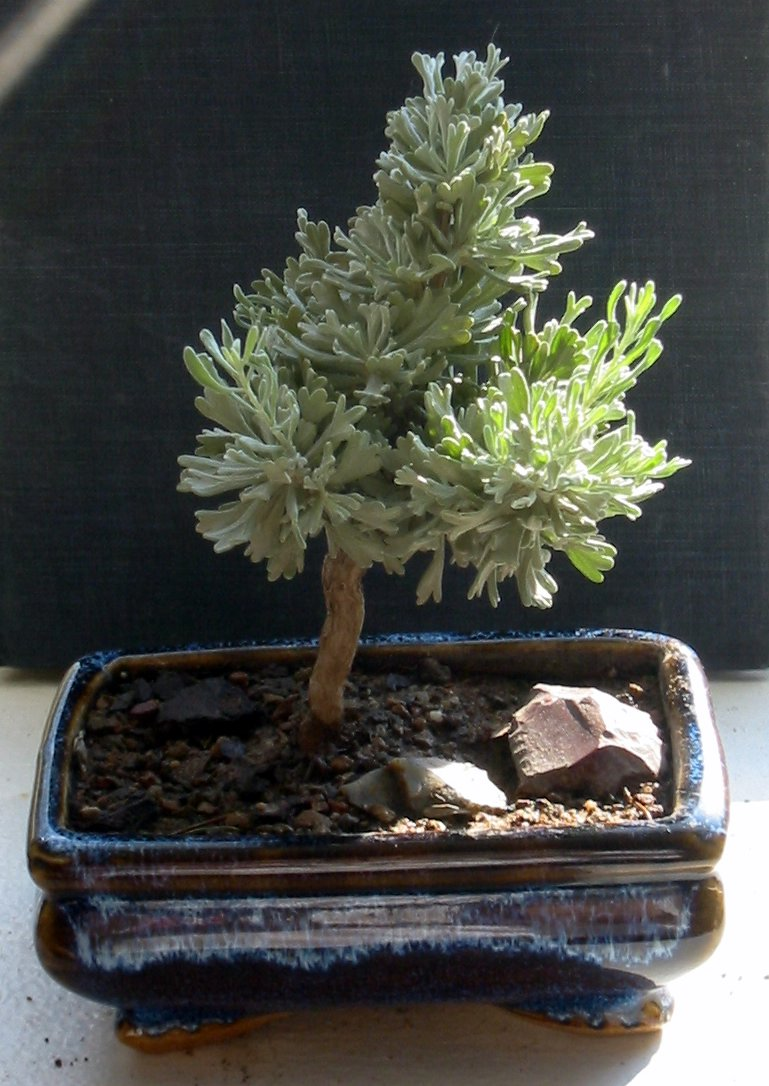
A young sagebrush grown as bonsai, showing the typical leaf configuration

It is used as a herbal medicine by Native Americans throughout the Intermountain West of North America, most notably as a smudging herb. It is also used for preventing infection in wounds, stopping internal bleeding, and treating headaches and colds.

The Navajo use the vapors of sagebrush as a treatment for headache. The Okanagan and Colville people used sagebrush to smoke hides.

Among the Zuni people, an infusion of the leaves is used externally for body aches. The infusion is also taken as a cold medicine. It is also placed in shoes to treat athlete's foot, fissures between toes, and as a foot deodorant.

== Culture ==
Artemisia tridentata is the state flower of Nevada.

== See also ==
- Great Basin Desert
- Medicinal plants of the American West
