= Eutreta xanthochaeta =

Scientific classification
- Kingdom: Animalia
- Phylum: Arthropoda
- Clade: Pancrustacea
- Class: Insecta
- Order: Diptera
- Family: Tephritidae
- Subfamily: Tephritinae
- Tribe: Eutretini
- Genus: Eutreta
- Species: E. xanthochaeta

Binomial name
- Eutreta xanthochaeta Aldrich, 1923

Species of fly

Eutreta xanthochaeta is a species of tephritid or fruit flies in the genus Eutreta of the family Tephritidae. It induces galls on Lantana camara.

== Distribution ==
Mexico, Guatemala, El Salvador. Introduced to Hawaii, Australia.
