= Eutreta fenestrata =

Scientific classification
- Kingdom: Animalia
- Phylum: Arthropoda
- Clade: Pancrustacea
- Class: Insecta
- Order: Diptera
- Family: Tephritidae
- Subfamily: Tephritinae
- Tribe: Eutretini
- Genus: Eutreta
- Species: E. fenestrata

Binomial name
- Eutreta fenestrata (Foote, 1960)

Synonyms
- Eutreta modocorum Blanc, 1987; Metatephritis fenestrata Foote, 1960

Species of fly

Eutreta fenestrata is a species of fruit fly in the family Tephritidae.

== Distribution ==
United States.
