= Eutreta caliptera =

Scientific classification
- Kingdom: Animalia
- Phylum: Arthropoda
- Clade: Pancrustacea
- Class: Insecta
- Order: Diptera
- Family: Tephritidae
- Subfamily: Tephritinae
- Tribe: Eutretini
- Genus: Eutreta
- Species: E. caliptera

Binomial name
- Eutreta caliptera (Say, 1830)

Synonyms
- Trypeta caliptera Say, 1830; Eutreta calyptera Aczél, 1950

Species of fly

Eutreta caliptera is a species of fruit fly in the family Tephritidae.

== Distribution ==
Canada, United States.
