= Xanthomyia japonica =

Scientific classification
- Kingdom: Animalia
- Phylum: Arthropoda
- Class: Insecta
- Order: Diptera
- Family: Tephritidae
- Subfamily: Tephritinae
- Tribe: Eutretini
- Genus: Xanthomyia
- Species: X. japonica

Binomial name
- Xanthomyia japonica (Shiraki, 1933)

Synonyms
- Paranoeeta japonica Shiraki, 1933

Species of fly

Xanthomyia japonica is a species of tephritid or fruit flies in the genus Xanthomyia of the family Tephritidae.

== Distribution ==
Russia, China, Japan.
