= Eutreta simplex =

Scientific classification
- Kingdom: Animalia
- Phylum: Arthropoda
- Clade: Pancrustacea
- Class: Insecta
- Order: Diptera
- Family: Tephritidae
- Subfamily: Tephritinae
- Tribe: Eutretini
- Genus: Eutreta
- Species: E. simplex

Binomial name
- Eutreta simplex Thomas, 1914

Species of fly

Eutreta simplex is a species of tephritid or fruit flies in the genus Eutreta of the family Tephritidae. During the larval stage they form galls on members of the Asteraceae family, such as Artemesia ludoviciana.

== Distribution ==
United States. They have been documented in California, Colorado, New Mexico, and most recently, Kansas.
