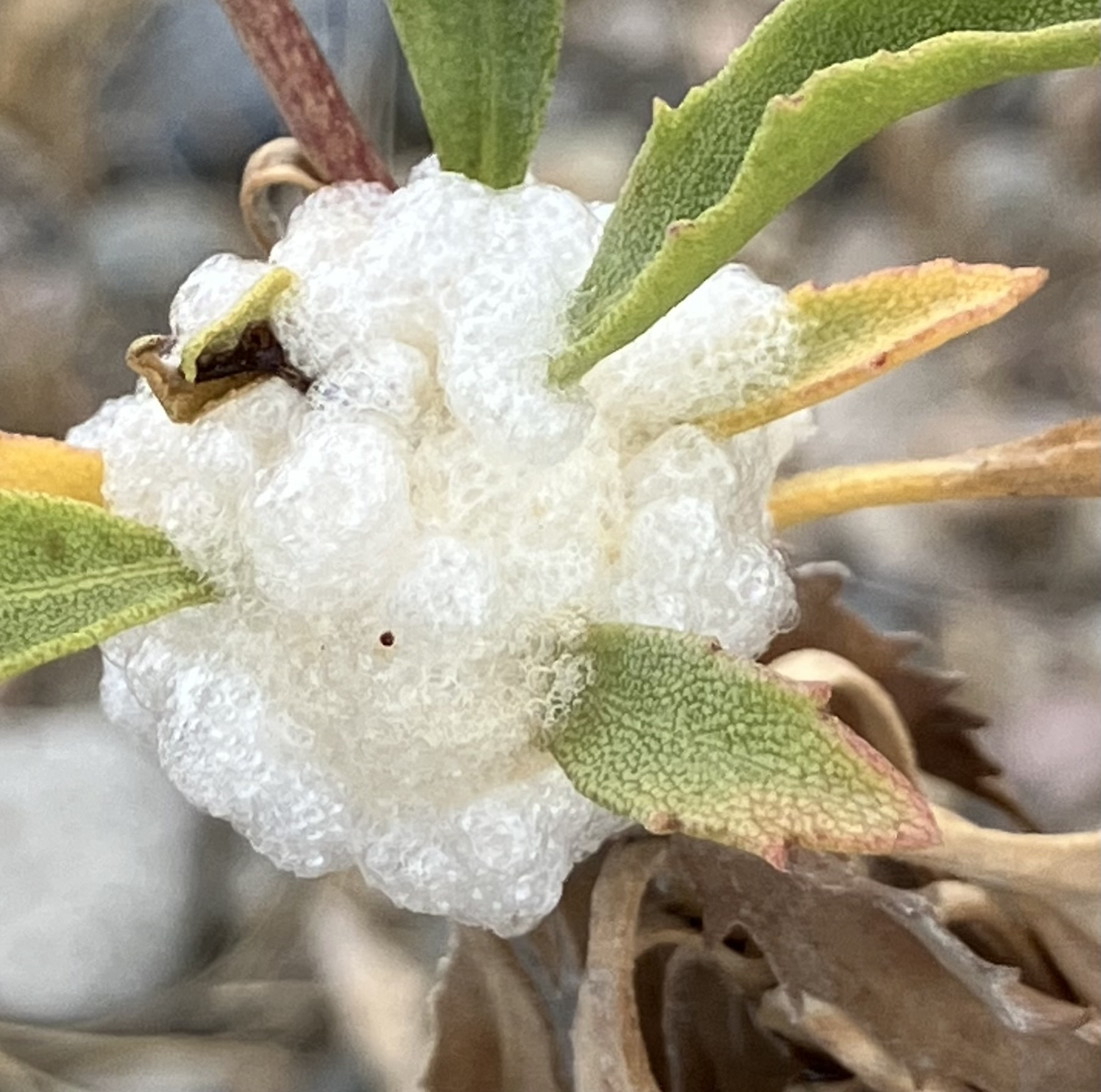
- Foam surrounding stem gall caused by R. baccharidis

Scientific classification
- Kingdom: Animalia
- Phylum: Arthropoda
- Clade: Pancrustacea
- Class: Insecta
- Order: Diptera
- Family: Tephritidae
- Subfamily: Tephritinae
- Tribe: Eutretini
- Genus: Rachiptera
- Species: R. baccharidis

Binomial name
- Rachiptera baccharidis Rondani, 1868

Synonyms
- Strobelia baccharidis Rondani, 1868; Trypeta cuculi Kieffer & Jörgensen, 1910; Trypeta scudderi Weyenbergh, 1883

= Rachiptera baccharidis =

Species of fly

Rachiptera baccharidis is a species of fruit fly in the family Tephritidae.

== Distribution ==
Argentina.
