= Stenopa vulnerata =

Scientific classification
- Kingdom: Animalia
- Phylum: Arthropoda
- Class: Insecta
- Order: Diptera
- Family: Tephritidae
- Subfamily: Tephritinae
- Tribe: Eutretini
- Genus: Stenopa
- Species: S. vulnerata

Binomial name
- Stenopa vulnerata Loew, 1873

Synonyms
- Trypeta vulnerata Loew, 1873

Species of fly

Stenopa vulnerata is a species of tephritid or fruit flies in the genus Stenopa of the family Tephritidae.

== Distribution ==
Canada & United States.
