= Afreutreta bipunctata =

Scientific classification
- Kingdom: Animalia
- Phylum: Arthropoda
- Class: Insecta
- Order: Diptera
- Family: Tephritidae
- Subfamily: Tephritinae
- Tribe: Eutretini
- Genus: Afreutreta
- Species: A. bipunctata

Binomial name
- Afreutreta bipunctata (Loew, 1869)

Synonyms
- Trypeta bipunctata Loew, 1869

Species of fly

Afreutreta bipunctata is a species of tephritid or fruit flies in the genus Afreutreta of the family Tephritidae.

== Distribution ==
South Africa.
