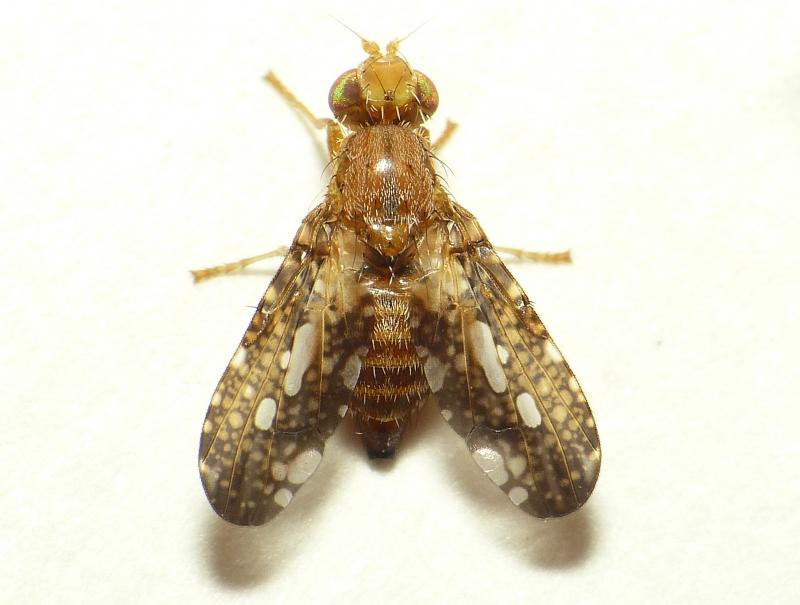
- Merzomyia westermanni

Scientific classification
- Kingdom: Animalia
- Phylum: Arthropoda
- Class: Insecta
- Order: Diptera
- Family: Tephritidae
- Subfamily: Tephritinae
- Tribe: Eutretini
- Genus: Merzomyia
- Species: M. westermanni

Binomial name
- Merzomyia westermanni Meigen, 1826

Synonyms
- Trypeta westermanni Meigen, 1826; Oxyphora cardui Robineau-Desvoidy, 1830; Westermannia tephritisioides Lioy, 1864; Icterica tephritisoides Hendel, 1927

= Merzomyia westermanni =

Species of fly

Merzomyia westermanni is a species of tephritid or fruit flies in the genus Merzomyia of the family Tephritidae.It is a medium-sized fly also commonly known as the ‘Swiss Cheese Tephritid’. Its wings, which span up to 7.1 mm, are intricately patterned with reticulated golden-brown markings. A distinct clear patch of irregular size and shape is displayed in the center of each wing. It possesses two pairs of strong dorsal setae on the thorax, dark orange legs, and almost-black oviscape and lower abdomen.

== Distribution ==
Records of M. westermanni span the temperate areas of the western and central Palaearctic, from Yorkshire, UK in the north-west to the Caucasus in the South, with the most easterly records coming from Ukraine. Records in the UK are scattered and restricted largely to the south, but no scarcity status was assigned by Falk et al.(2016).
