= Merzomyia mongolica =

Scientific classification
- Kingdom: Animalia
- Phylum: Arthropoda
- Class: Insecta
- Order: Diptera
- Family: Tephritidae
- Subfamily: Tephritinae
- Tribe: Eutretini
- Genus: Merzomyia
- Species: M. mongolica

Binomial name
- Merzomyia mongolica Korneyev, 1990

Synonyms
- Orotava mongolica Korneyev, 1990

Species of fly

Merzomyia mongolica is a species of tephritid or fruit flies in the genus Merzomyia of the family Tephritidae.

== Distribution ==
Merzomyia mongolica is found in Mongolia.
