= Xanthomyia alpestris =

Scientific classification
- Kingdom: Animalia
- Phylum: Arthropoda
- Class: Insecta
- Order: Diptera
- Family: Tephritidae
- Subfamily: Tephritinae
- Tribe: Eutretini
- Genus: Xanthomyia
- Species: X. alpestris

Binomial name
- Xanthomyia alpestris (Pokorny, 1887)

Synonyms
- Carphotricha platyptera Pokorny, 1887; Campiglossa nigroscutellata Chen, 1938; Carphotricha pseudoradiata Becker, 1900

Species of fly

Xanthomyia alpestris is a species of tephritid or fruit flies in the genus Xanthomyia of the family Tephritidae.

== Distribution ==
Finland, Russia, Kazakhstan, Mongolia, China.
