= Xanthomyia nora =

Scientific classification
- Kingdom: Animalia
- Phylum: Arthropoda
- Class: Insecta
- Order: Diptera
- Family: Tephritidae
- Subfamily: Tephritinae
- Tribe: Eutretini
- Genus: Xanthomyia
- Species: X. nora

Binomial name
- Xanthomyia nora (Doane, 1899)

Synonyms
- Eutreta nora Doane, 1899

Species of fly

Xanthomyia nora is a species of tephritid or fruit flies in the genus Xanthomyia of the family Tephritidae.

== Distribution ==
Canada, United States.
