= Pseudeutreta ligularis =

Scientific classification
- Kingdom: Animalia
- Phylum: Arthropoda
- Class: Insecta
- Order: Diptera
- Family: Tephritidae
- Subfamily: Tephritinae
- Tribe: Eutretini
- Genus: Pseudeutreta
- Species: P. ligularis

Binomial name
- Pseudeutreta ligularis Bates, 1933

Species of fly

Pseudeutreta ligularis is a species of tephritid or fruit flies in the genus Pseudeutreta of the family Tephritidae.

== Distribution ==
Bolivia, Brazil. Argentina.
