= Cryptotreta pallida =

Scientific classification
- Kingdom: Animalia
- Phylum: Arthropoda
- Class: Insecta
- Order: Diptera
- Family: Tephritidae
- Subfamily: Tephritinae
- Tribe: Eutretini
- Genus: Cryptotreta
- Species: C. pallida

Binomial name
- Cryptotreta pallida (Cole, 1923)

Synonyms
- Eurosta pallida Cole, 1923

Species of fly

Cryptotreta pallida is a species of tephritid or fruit flies in the genus Cryptotreta of the family Tephritidae.

== Distribution ==
Mexico.
