= Eutreta frontalis =

Scientific classification
- Kingdom: Animalia
- Phylum: Arthropoda
- Clade: Pancrustacea
- Class: Insecta
- Order: Diptera
- Family: Tephritidae
- Subfamily: Tephritinae
- Tribe: Eutretini
- Genus: Eutreta
- Species: E. frontalis

Binomial name
- Eutreta frontalis Curran, 1932

Species of fly

Eutreta frontalis is a species of tephritid or fruit flies in the genus Eutreta of the family Tephritidae.

== Distribution ==
Canada, United States.
