= Dictyotrypeta incisum =

Scientific classification
- Kingdom: Animalia
- Phylum: Arthropoda
- Class: Insecta
- Order: Diptera
- Family: Tephritidae
- Subfamily: Tephritinae
- Tribe: Eutretini
- Genus: Dictyotrypeta
- Species: D. incisum

Binomial name
- Dictyotrypeta incisum (Wulp, 1899)

Synonyms
- Acrotaenia incisum Wulp, 1899

Species of fly

Dictyotrypeta incisum is a species of tephritid or fruit flies in the genus Dictyotrypeta of the family Tephritidae.

== Distribution ==
Mexico, Guatemala.
