= Pseudeutreta adspersa =

Scientific classification
- Kingdom: Animalia
- Phylum: Arthropoda
- Class: Insecta
- Order: Diptera
- Family: Tephritidae
- Subfamily: Tephritinae
- Tribe: Eutretini
- Genus: Pseudeutreta
- Species: P. adspersa

Binomial name
- Pseudeutreta adspersa (Wiedemann, 1830)

Synonyms
- Trypeta adspersa Wiedemann, 1830

Species of fly

Pseudeutreta adspersa is a species of tephritid or fruit flies in the genus Pseudeutreta of the family Tephritidae.

== Distribution ==
Brazil
