= Cosmetothrix discoidalis =

Scientific classification
- Kingdom: Animalia
- Phylum: Arthropoda
- Class: Insecta
- Order: Diptera
- Family: Tephritidae
- Subfamily: Tephritinae
- Tribe: Eutretini
- Genus: Cosmetothrix
- Species: C. discoidalis

Binomial name
- Cosmetothrix discoidalis (Bezzi, 1924)

Synonyms
- Afreutreta discoidalis Bezzi, 1924

Species of fly

Cosmetothrix discoidalis is a species of tephritid or fruit flies in the genus Cosmetothrix of the family Tephritidae.

== Distribution ==
South Africa.
