= Eutreta angusta =

Scientific classification
- Kingdom: Animalia
- Phylum: Arthropoda
- Clade: Pancrustacea
- Class: Insecta
- Order: Diptera
- Family: Tephritidae
- Subfamily: Tephritinae
- Tribe: Eutretini
- Genus: Eutreta
- Species: E. angusta

Binomial name
- Eutreta angusta Banks, 1926

Synonyms
- Eutreta pacifica Curran, 1932

Species of fly

Eutreta angusta is a species of fruit fly in the family Tephritidae.

== Distribution ==
United States, Guatemala & Belize.
