= Dictyotrypeta crenulata =

Scientific classification
- Kingdom: Animalia
- Phylum: Arthropoda
- Class: Insecta
- Order: Diptera
- Family: Tephritidae
- Subfamily: Tephritinae
- Tribe: Eutretini
- Genus: Dictyotrypeta
- Species: D. crenulata

Binomial name
- Dictyotrypeta crenulata (Wulp, 1900)

Synonyms
- Euaresta crenulata Wulp, 1900

Species of fly

Dictyotrypeta crenulata is a species of tephritid or fruit flies in the genus Dictyotrypeta of the family Tephritidae.

== Distribution ==
Mexico.
