= Rachiptera limbata =

Scientific classification
- Kingdom: Animalia
- Phylum: Arthropoda
- Class: Insecta
- Order: Diptera
- Family: Tephritidae
- Subfamily: Tephritinae
- Tribe: Eutretini
- Genus: Rachiptera
- Species: R. limbata

Binomial name
- Rachiptera limbata Bigot, 1859

Synonyms
- Eupterocalla opazoi Brèthes, 1916; Percnoptera angustipennis Philippi, 1873

Species of fly

Rachiptera limbata is a species of tephritid or fruit flies in the genus Rachiptera of the family Tephritidae.

== Distribution ==
Bolivia, Chile, Argentina.
