= Dracontomyia footei =

Scientific classification
- Kingdom: Animalia
- Phylum: Arthropoda
- Class: Insecta
- Order: Diptera
- Family: Tephritidae
- Subfamily: Tephritinae
- Tribe: Eutretini
- Genus: Dracontomyia
- Species: D. footei

Binomial name
- Dracontomyia footei Aczél, 1953

Species of fly

Dracontomyia footei is a species of tephritid or fruit flies in the genus Dracontomyia of the family Tephritidae.

== Distribution ==
Ecuador, Peru.
