= Polymorphomyia basilica =

Scientific classification
- Kingdom: Animalia
- Phylum: Arthropoda
- Class: Insecta
- Order: Diptera
- Family: Tephritidae
- Subfamily: Tephritinae
- Tribe: Eutretini
- Genus: Polymorphomyia
- Species: P. basilica

Binomial name
- Polymorphomyia basilica Snow, 1894

Species of fly

Polymorphomyia basilica is a species of tephritid or fruit flies in the genus Polymorphomyia of the family Tephritidae.

== Distribution ==
Cuba, Dominican Republic, Jamaica, Puerto Rico.
