= Pseudeutreta quadrigutta =

Scientific classification
- Kingdom: Animalia
- Phylum: Arthropoda
- Class: Insecta
- Order: Diptera
- Family: Tephritidae
- Subfamily: Tephritinae
- Tribe: Eutretini
- Genus: Pseudeutreta
- Species: P. quadrigutta

Binomial name
- Pseudeutreta quadrigutta (Walker, 1853)

Synonyms
- Trypeta quadrigutta Walker, 1853

Species of fly

Pseudeutreta quadrigutta is a species of tephritid or fruit flies in the genus Pseudeutreta of the family Tephritidae.

== Distribution ==
South America.
