= Polymorphomyia footei =

Scientific classification
- Kingdom: Animalia
- Phylum: Arthropoda
- Class: Insecta
- Order: Diptera
- Family: Tephritidae
- Subfamily: Tephritinae
- Tribe: Eutretini
- Genus: Polymorphomyia
- Species: P. footei

Binomial name
- Polymorphomyia footei Korytkowski, 1971

Species of fly

Polymorphomyia footei is a species of tephritid or fruit flies in the genus Polymorphomyia of the family Tephritidae.

== Distribution ==
Peru.
