= Xanthomyia platyptera =

Scientific classification
- Kingdom: Animalia
- Phylum: Arthropoda
- Class: Insecta
- Order: Diptera
- Family: Tephritidae
- Subfamily: Tephritinae
- Tribe: Eutretini
- Genus: Xanthomyia
- Species: X. platyptera

Binomial name
- Xanthomyia platyptera (Loew, 1873)

Synonyms
- Trypeta platyptera Loew, 1873

Species of fly

Xanthomyia platyptera is a species of tephritid or fruit flies in the genus Xanthomyia of the family Tephritidae.

== Distribution ==
United States.
