= Eutreta rotundipennis =

Scientific classification
- Kingdom: Animalia
- Phylum: Arthropoda
- Clade: Pancrustacea
- Class: Insecta
- Order: Diptera
- Family: Tephritidae
- Subfamily: Tephritinae
- Tribe: Eutretini
- Genus: Eutreta
- Species: E. rotundipennis

Binomial name
- Eutreta rotundipennis (Loew, 1862)

Synonyms
- Trypeta rotundipennis Loew, 1862

Species of fly

Eutreta rotundipennis is a species of fruit fly in the family Tephritidae.

== Distribution ==
United States.
