= Eutreta patagiata =

Scientific classification
- Kingdom: Animalia
- Phylum: Arthropoda
- Clade: Pancrustacea
- Class: Insecta
- Order: Diptera
- Family: Tephritidae
- Subfamily: Tephritinae
- Tribe: Eutretini
- Genus: Eutreta
- Species: E. patagiata

Binomial name
- Eutreta patagiata Wulp, 1899

Synonyms
- Eutreta patagatia Aczél, 1950

Species of fly

Eutreta patagiata is a species of tephritid or fruit flies in the genus Eutreta of the family Tephritidae.

== Distribution ==
Mexico.
