= Dictyotrypeta atacta =

Scientific classification
- Kingdom: Animalia
- Phylum: Arthropoda
- Class: Insecta
- Order: Diptera
- Family: Tephritidae
- Subfamily: Tephritinae
- Tribe: Eutretini
- Genus: Dictyotrypeta
- Species: D. atacta

Binomial name
- Dictyotrypeta atacta (Hendel, 1914)

Synonyms
- Icterica atacta Hendel, 1914

Species of fly

Dictyotrypeta atacta is a species of tephritid or fruit flies in the genus Dictyotrypeta of the family Tephritidae.

== Distribution ==
Paraguay, Brazil.
