= Eutreta distincta =

Scientific classification
- Kingdom: Animalia
- Phylum: Arthropoda
- Clade: Pancrustacea
- Class: Insecta
- Order: Diptera
- Family: Tephritidae
- Subfamily: Tephritinae
- Tribe: Eutretini
- Genus: Eutreta
- Species: E. distincta

Binomial name
- Eutreta distincta Schiner, 1868

Synonyms
- Icaria distincta Schiner, 1868

Species of fly

Eutreta distincta is a species of tephritid or fruit flies in the genus Eutreta of the family Tephritidae.

== Distribution ==
Venezuela, Peru, Bolivia, Brazil.
