= Tarchonanthea frauenfeldi =

Scientific classification
- Kingdom: Animalia
- Phylum: Arthropoda
- Class: Insecta
- Order: Diptera
- Family: Tephritidae
- Subfamily: Tephritinae
- Tribe: Eutretini
- Genus: Tarchonanthea
- Species: T. frauenfeldi

Binomial name
- Tarchonanthea frauenfeldi Schiner, 1868

Synonyms
- Icaria frauenfeldi Schiner, 1868

Species of fly

Tarchonanthea frauenfeldi is a species of tephritid or fruit flies in the genus Tarchonanthea of the family Tephritidae.

== Distribution ==
Namibia, South Africa.
