= Cryptotreta cislimitensis =

Scientific classification
- Kingdom: Animalia
- Phylum: Arthropoda
- Class: Insecta
- Order: Diptera
- Family: Tephritidae
- Subfamily: Tephritinae
- Tribe: Eutretini
- Genus: Cryptotreta
- Species: C. cislimitensis

Binomial name
- Cryptotreta cislimitensis Steyskal, 1977

Species of fly

Cryptotreta cislimitensis is a species of tephritid or fruit flies in the genus Cryptotreta of the family Tephritidae.

== Distribution ==
United States.
