= Dictyotrypeta cometa =

Scientific classification
- Kingdom: Animalia
- Phylum: Arthropoda
- Class: Insecta
- Order: Diptera
- Family: Tephritidae
- Subfamily: Tephritinae
- Tribe: Eutretini
- Genus: Dictyotrypeta
- Species: D. cometa

Binomial name
- Dictyotrypeta cometa (Malloch, 1933)

Synonyms
- Icterica cometa Malloch, 1933

Species of fly

Dictyotrypeta cometa is a species of tephritid or fruit flies in the genus Dictyotrypeta of the family Tephritidae.

== Distribution ==
Argentina.
