= Pseudeutreta baccharidis =

Scientific classification
- Kingdom: Animalia
- Phylum: Arthropoda
- Class: Insecta
- Order: Diptera
- Family: Tephritidae
- Subfamily: Tephritinae
- Tribe: Eutretini
- Genus: Pseudeutreta
- Species: P. baccharidis

Binomial name
- Pseudeutreta baccharidis (Kieffer & Jörgensen, 1910)

Synonyms
- Aciura baccharidis Kieffer & Jörgensen, 1910

Species of fly

Pseudeutreta baccharidis is a species of tephritid or fruit flies in the genus Pseudeutreta of the family Tephritidae.

== Distribution ==
Argentina.
