= Merzomyia licenti =

Scientific classification
- Kingdom: Animalia
- Phylum: Arthropoda
- Class: Insecta
- Order: Diptera
- Family: Tephritidae
- Subfamily: Tephritinae
- Tribe: Eutretini
- Genus: Merzomyia
- Species: M. licenti

Binomial name
- Merzomyia licenti (Chen, 1938)

Synonyms
- Acinia licenti Chen, 1938

Species of fly

Merzomyia licenti is a species of tephritid or fruit flies in the genus Merzomyia of the family Tephritidae.

== Distribution ==
China, Russia.
