= Stenopa affinis =

Scientific classification
- Kingdom: Animalia
- Phylum: Arthropoda
- Class: Insecta
- Order: Diptera
- Family: Tephritidae
- Subfamily: Tephritinae
- Tribe: Eutretini
- Genus: Stenopa
- Species: S. affinis

Binomial name
- Stenopa affinis Quisenberry, 1949

Species of fly

Stenopa affinis is a species of tephritid or fruit flies in the genus Stenopa of the family Tephritidae.

== Distribution ==
United States.
