= Eutreta aczeli =

Scientific classification
- Kingdom: Animalia
- Phylum: Arthropoda
- Clade: Pancrustacea
- Class: Insecta
- Order: Diptera
- Family: Tephritidae
- Subfamily: Tephritinae
- Tribe: Eutretini
- Genus: Eutreta
- Species: E. aczeli

Binomial name
- Eutreta aczeli Lima, 1954

Species of fly

Eutreta aczeli is a species of fruit fly in the family Tephritidae.

== Distribution ==
Colombia, Brazil.
