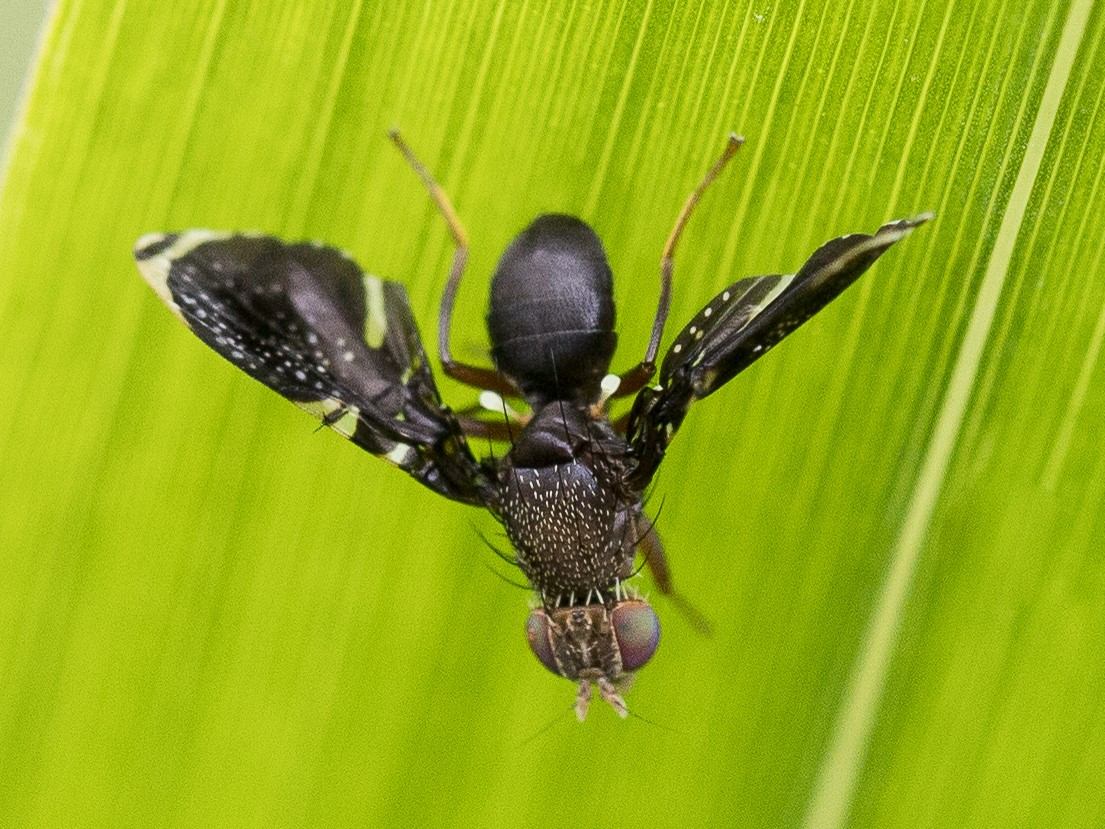

Scientific classification
- Kingdom: Animalia
- Phylum: Arthropoda
- Clade: Pancrustacea
- Class: Insecta
- Order: Diptera
- Family: Tephritidae
- Subfamily: Tephritinae
- Tribe: Eutretini
- Genus: Pseudeutreta
- Species: P. anteapicalis

Binomial name
- Pseudeutreta anteapicalis Hendel, 1914

Synonyms
- Pseudeutreta bosqui Aczél, 1953

= Pseudeutreta anteapicalis =

Species of fly

Pseudeutreta anteapicalis is a species of tephritid or fruit flies in the genus Pseudeutreta of the family Tephritidae.

== Distribution ==
Bolivia, Paraguay, Argentina, Brazil.
