= Pseudeutreta orfilai =

Scientific classification
- Kingdom: Animalia
- Phylum: Arthropoda
- Class: Insecta
- Order: Diptera
- Family: Tephritidae
- Subfamily: Tephritinae
- Tribe: Eutretini
- Genus: Pseudeutreta
- Species: P. orfilai

Binomial name
- Pseudeutreta orfilai Aczél, 1953

Synonyms
- Polymorphomyia orfilai Aczél, 1953

Species of fly

Pseudeutreta orfilai is a species of tephritid or fruit flies in the genus Pseudeutreta of the family Tephritidae.

== Distribution ==
Bolivia to Argentina.
