= Eutreta christophe =

Scientific classification
- Kingdom: Animalia
- Phylum: Arthropoda
- Clade: Pancrustacea
- Class: Insecta
- Order: Diptera
- Family: Tephritidae
- Subfamily: Tephritinae
- Tribe: Eutretini
- Genus: Eutreta
- Species: E. christophe

Binomial name
- Eutreta christophe (Bates, 1933)

Synonyms
- Trypeta christophe Bates, 1933

Species of fly

Eutreta christophe is a species of fruit fly in the family Tephritidae.

== Distribution ==
Mexico, Haiti.
