= Eutreta apicalis =

Scientific classification
- Kingdom: Animalia
- Phylum: Arthropoda
- Clade: Pancrustacea
- Class: Insecta
- Order: Diptera
- Family: Tephritidae
- Subfamily: Tephritinae
- Tribe: Eutretini
- Genus: Eutreta
- Species: E. apicalis

Binomial name
- Eutreta apicalis (Coquillett, 1904)

Synonyms
- Icterica apicalis Coquillett, 1904

Species of fly

Eutreta apicalis is a species of fruit fly in the family Tephritidae.

== Distribution ==
Mexico, Nicaragua, Costa Rica.
