= Pseudeutreta lunulata =

Scientific classification
- Kingdom: Animalia
- Phylum: Arthropoda
- Class: Insecta
- Order: Diptera
- Family: Tephritidae
- Subfamily: Tephritinae
- Tribe: Eutretini
- Genus: Pseudeutreta
- Species: P. lunulata

Binomial name
- Pseudeutreta lunulata (Macquart, 1851)

Synonyms
- Platystoma lunulata Macquart, 1851

Species of fly

Pseudeutreta lunulata is a species of tephritid or fruit flies in the genus Pseudeutreta of the family Tephritidae.

== Distribution ==
Brazil.
