= Eutreta novaeboracensis =

Scientific classification
- Kingdom: Animalia
- Phylum: Arthropoda
- Clade: Pancrustacea
- Class: Insecta
- Order: Diptera
- Family: Tephritidae
- Subfamily: Tephritinae
- Tribe: Eutretini
- Genus: Eutreta
- Species: E. novaeboracensis

Binomial name
- Eutreta novaeboracensis (Fitch, 1855)

Synonyms
- Acinia novaeboracensis Fitch, 1855; Trypeta cribripennis Johnson, 1925

Species of fly

Eutreta novaeboracensis is a species of tephritid or fruit flies in the genus Eutreta of the family Tephritidae.

== Distribution ==
United States, Canada.
