= Tarchonanthea coleoptrata =

Scientific classification
- Kingdom: Animalia
- Phylum: Arthropoda
- Class: Insecta
- Order: Diptera
- Family: Tephritidae
- Subfamily: Tephritinae
- Tribe: Eutretini
- Genus: Tarchonanthea
- Species: T. coleoptrata

Binomial name
- Tarchonanthea coleoptrata Freidberg & Kaplan, 1993

Species of fly

Tarchonanthea coleoptrata is a species of tephritid or fruit flies in the genus Tarchonanthea of the family Tephritidae.

== Distribution ==
Kenya, Tanzania.
