= Polymorphomyia striola =

Scientific classification
- Kingdom: Animalia
- Phylum: Arthropoda
- Class: Insecta
- Order: Diptera
- Family: Tephritidae
- Subfamily: Tephritinae
- Tribe: Eutretini
- Genus: Polymorphomyia
- Species: P. striola

Binomial name
- Polymorphomyia striola (Fabricius, 1805)

Synonyms
- Tephritis striola Fabricius, 1805

Species of fly

Polymorphomyia striola is a species of tephritid or fruit flies in the genus Polymorphomyia of the family Tephritidae.

== Distribution ==
Guyana.
