= Eutreta brasiliensis =

Scientific classification
- Kingdom: Animalia
- Phylum: Arthropoda
- Clade: Pancrustacea
- Class: Insecta
- Order: Diptera
- Family: Tephritidae
- Subfamily: Tephritinae
- Tribe: Eutretini
- Genus: Eutreta
- Species: E. brasiliensis

Binomial name
- Eutreta brasiliensis Stoltzfus, 1977

Species of fly

Eutreta brasiliensis is a species of tephritidae also known as Fruit Flies which is part of the genus Eutreta family, Tephritidae.

This species is of interest in both ecological studies and pest management due to its interactions with host plants and potential impact on agriculture.

== Distribution ==
Brazil.
