= Polymorphomyia tridentata =

Scientific classification
- Kingdom: Animalia
- Phylum: Arthropoda
- Class: Insecta
- Order: Diptera
- Family: Tephritidae
- Subfamily: Tephritinae
- Tribe: Eutretini
- Genus: Polymorphomyia
- Species: P. tridentata

Binomial name
- Polymorphomyia tridentata (Hendel, 1914)

Synonyms
- Pseudeutreta tridentata Hendel, 1914

Species of fly

Polymorphomyia tridentata is a species of tephritid or fruit flies in the genus Polymorphomyia of the family Tephritidae.

== Distribution ==
Ecuador, Peru, Bolivia, Paraguay, Argentina, Brazil.
