= Oxyna dracunculina =

Scientific classification
- Kingdom: Animalia
- Phylum: Arthropoda
- Clade: Pancrustacea
- Class: Insecta
- Order: Diptera
- Family: Tephritidae
- Subfamily: Tephritinae
- Tribe: Tephritini
- Genus: Oxyna
- Species: O. dracunculina

Binomial name
- Oxyna dracunculina Richter, 1990

Synonyms
- Oxyna dracunculi Richter, 1964

Species of fly

Oxyna dracunculina is a species of fruit fly in the family Tephritidae.

== Distribution ==
Kazakhstan, Mongolia.
