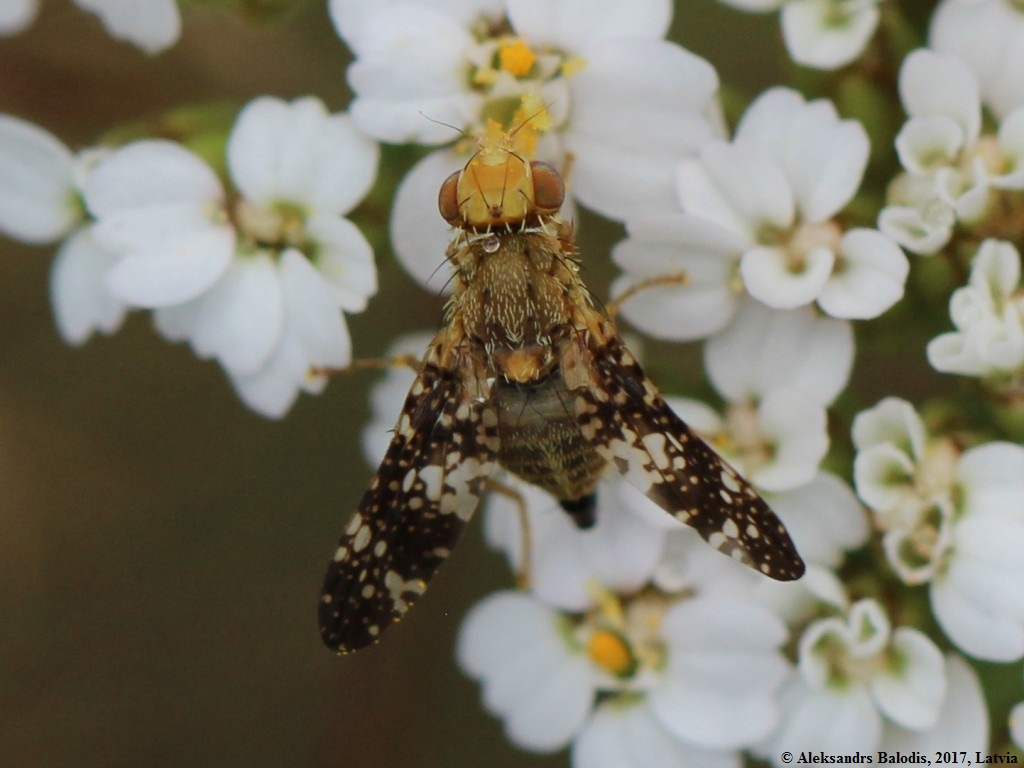
- Oxyna flavipennis

Scientific classification
- Kingdom: Animalia
- Phylum: Arthropoda
- Class: Insecta
- Order: Diptera
- Family: Tephritidae
- Subfamily: Tephritinae
- Tribe: Tephritini
- Genus: Oxyna; Robineau-Desvoidy, 1830

Type species
- Oxyna flavescens Robineau-Desvoidy, 1830

Synonyms
- Grandoxyna Dirlbek & Dirlbek, 1971; Sinoxyna Chen, 1938; Oxina Rondani, 1856

= Oxyna =

Genus of flies

Oxyna is a genus of fruit flies in the family Tephritidae. There are at least 20 described species in Oxyna.

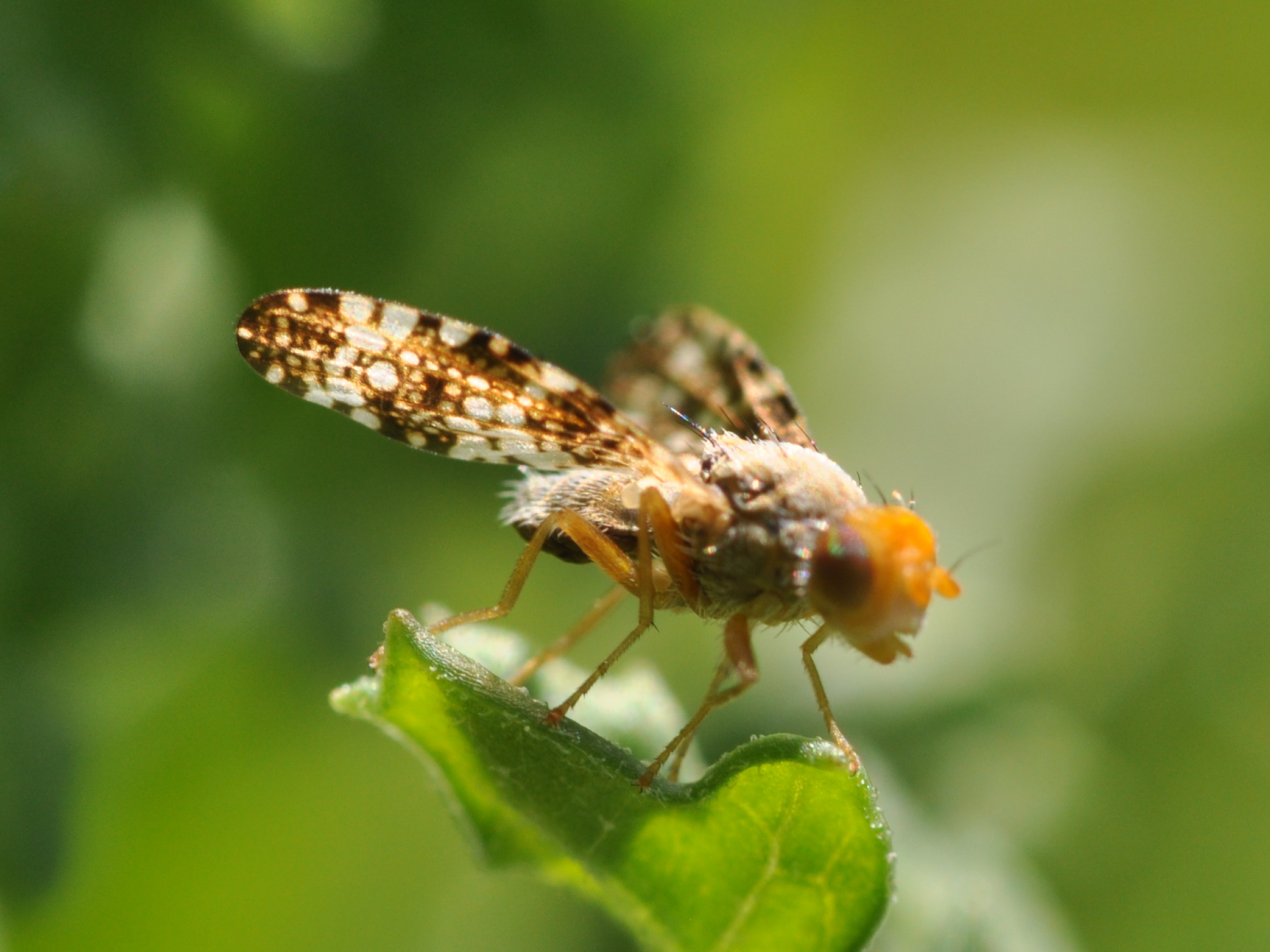
Oxyna parietina

== Species ==
These 27 species belong to the genus Oxyna:

- Oxyna albipila Loew, 1869
- Oxyna albofasciata Chen, 1938
- Oxyna amurensis Hendel, 1927
- Oxyna aterrima (Doane, 1899)
- Oxyna distincta Chen, 1938
- Oxyna dracunculina Richter, 1990
- Oxyna fenestrata (Zetterstedt, 1847)
- Oxyna flavipennis (Loew, 1844)
- Oxyna fusca Chen, 1938
- Oxyna gansuica Wang, 1996
- Oxyna guttatofasciata (Loew, 1850)
- Oxyna longicauda Korneyev, 1990
- Oxyna lutulenta Loew, 1869
- Oxyna maculata (Robineau-Desvoidy, 1830)
- Oxyna menyuanica Wang, 1996
- Oxyna nasuta Hering, 1936
- Oxyna nebulosa (Wiedemann, 1817)
- Oxyna obesa Loew, 1862
- Oxyna palpalis (Coquillett, 1904)
- Oxyna parietina (Linnaeus, 1758)
- Oxyna parva Chen, 1938
- Oxyna stackelbergi Korneyev, 1990
- Oxyna superflava Freidberg, 1974
- Oxyna tarbagatajensis Korneyev, 1990
- Oxyna tianshanica Korneyev, 1990
- Oxyna utahensis Quisenberry, 1949
- Oxyna variabilis Chen, 1938
