= Oxyna superflava =

Scientific classification
- Kingdom: Animalia
- Phylum: Arthropoda
- Clade: Pancrustacea
- Class: Insecta
- Order: Diptera
- Family: Tephritidae
- Subfamily: Tephritinae
- Tribe: Tephritini
- Genus: Oxyna
- Species: O. superflava

Binomial name
- Oxyna superflava Freidberg, 1974

Species of fly

Oxyna superflava is a species of fruit fly in the family Tephritidae.

== Distribution ==
Egypt.
