= Cryptotreta =

Scientific classification
- Kingdom: Animalia
- Phylum: Arthropoda
- Class: Insecta
- Order: Diptera
- Family: Tephritidae
- Subfamily: Tephritinae
- Tribe: Eutretini
- Genus: Cryptotreta; Blanc & Foote, 1961

Type species
- Eurosta pallida Cole, 1923

Synonyms
- Cryptotretra Edwards & Vevers, 1975

Genus of flies

Cryptotreta is a genus of tephritid or fruit flies in the family Tephritidae.

== Species ==
- Cryptotreta cislimitensis Steyskal, 1977
- Cryptotreta pallida (Cole, 1923)
