= Stenopa =

Scientific classification
- Kingdom: Animalia
- Phylum: Arthropoda
- Class: Insecta
- Order: Diptera
- Family: Tephritidae
- Subfamily: Tephritinae
- Tribe: Eutretini
- Genus: Stenopa; Loew, 1873

Type species
- Trypeta vulnerata Loew, 1873

Genus of flies

Stenopa is a genus of tephritid or fruit flies in the family Tephritidae.

== Species ==
- Stenopa affinis Quisenberry, 1949
- Stenopa mexicana Norrbom, 2010
- Stenopa vulnerata (Loew, 1873)
