= Rachiptera =

Scientific classification
- Kingdom: Animalia
- Phylum: Arthropoda
- Class: Insecta
- Order: Diptera
- Family: Tephritidae
- Subfamily: Tephritinae
- Tribe: Eutretini
- Genus: Rachiptera; Bigot, 1859

Type species
- Rachiptera limbata Bigot, 1859

Synonyms
- Strobelia Rondani, 1868; Percnoptera Philippi, 1873; Rhachiptera Hendel, 1914; Eupterocalla Brèthes, 1916

Genus of flies

Rachiptera is a genus of tephritid or fruit flies in the family Tephritidae.

== Species ==
- Rachiptera baccharidis (Rondani, 1868)
- Rachiptera limbata Bigot, 1859
