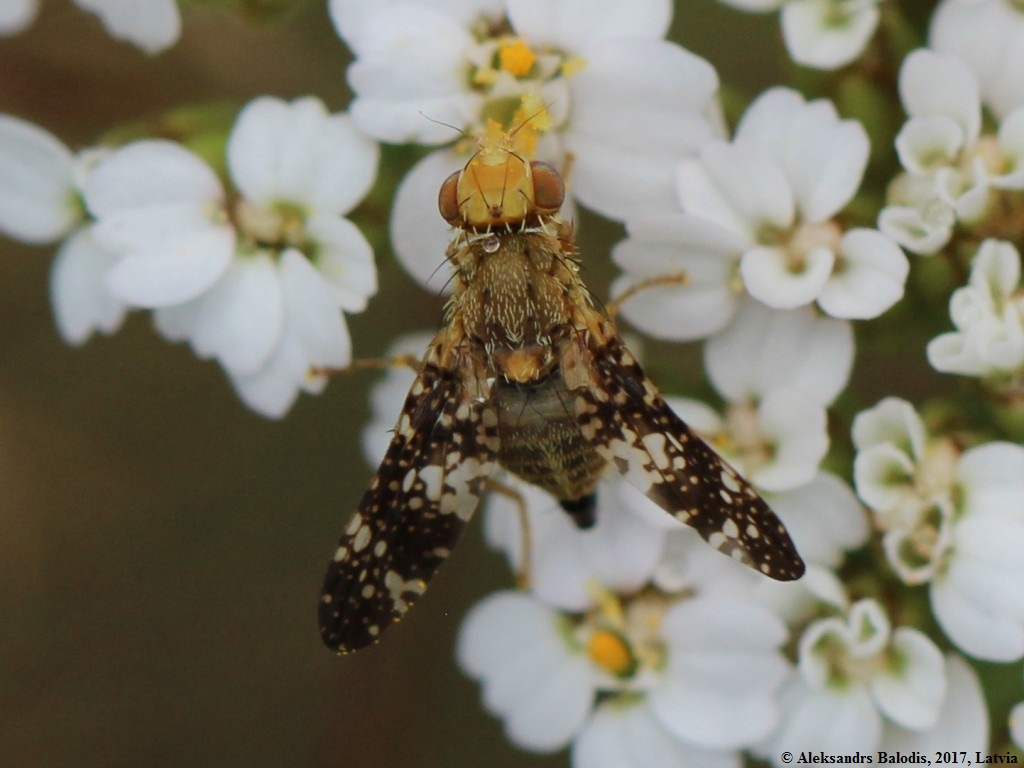
- Oxyna flavipennis

Scientific classification
- Kingdom: Animalia
- Phylum: Arthropoda
- Clade: Pancrustacea
- Class: Insecta
- Order: Diptera
- Family: Tephritidae
- Subfamily: Tephritinae
- Tribe: Tephritini
- Genus: Oxyna
- Species: O. flavipennis

Binomial name
- Oxyna flavipennis (Loew, 1844)

Synonyms
- Trypeta flavipennis Loew, 1844; Oxyna flavescens Robineau-Desvoidy, 1830

= Oxyna flavipennis =

Species of fly

Oxyna flavipennis is a species of fruit fly in the family Tephritidae.

== Distribution ==
United Kingdom & Scandinavia, South to Italy, Bulgaria & Caucasus.
