= Tarchonanthea =

Scientific classification
- Kingdom: Animalia
- Phylum: Arthropoda
- Class: Insecta
- Order: Diptera
- Family: Tephritidae
- Subfamily: Tephritinae
- Tribe: Eutretini
- Genus: Tarchonanthea; Freidberg & Kaplan, 1993

Type species
- Icaria frauenfeldi Schiner, 1868

Genus of flies

Tarchonanthea is a genus of tephritid or fruit flies in the family Tephritidae.

== Species ==
- Tarchonanthea frauenfeldi (Schiner, 1868)
- Tarchonanthea coleoptrata Freidberg & Kaplan, 1993
