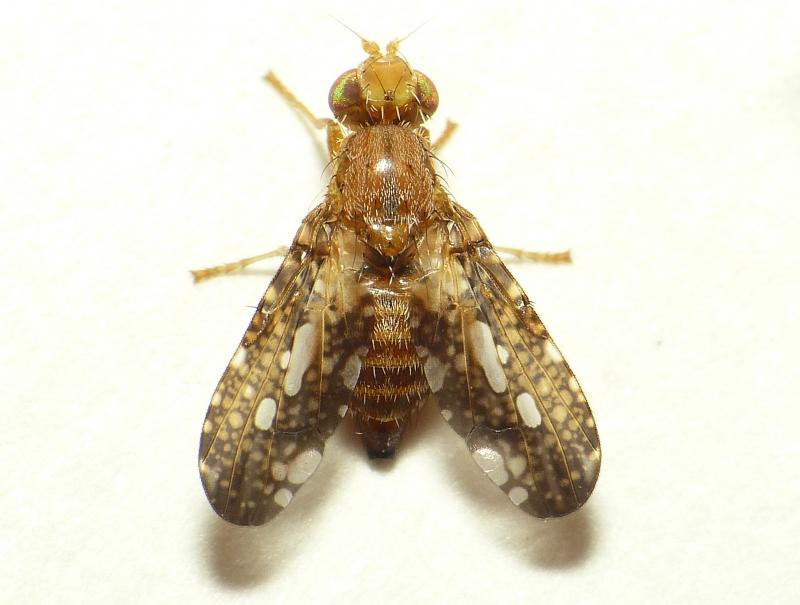
- Merzomyia westermanni

Scientific classification
- Kingdom: Animalia
- Phylum: Arthropoda
- Class: Insecta
- Order: Diptera
- Family: Tephritidae
- Subfamily: Tephritinae
- Tribe: Eutretini
- Genus: Merzomyia; Korneyev, 1996

Type species
- Trypeta westermanni Meigen, 1826

= Merzomyia =

Genus of flies

Merzomyia is a genus of tephritid or fruit flies in the family Tephritidae.

== Species ==
- Merzomyia licenti (Chen, 1938)
- Merzomyia mongolica (Korneyev, 1990)
- Merzomyia westermanni (Meigen, 1826)
