= Oxyna nebulosa =

Scientific classification
- Kingdom: Animalia
- Phylum: Arthropoda
- Clade: Pancrustacea
- Class: Insecta
- Order: Diptera
- Family: Tephritidae
- Subfamily: Tephritinae
- Tribe: Tephritini
- Genus: Oxyna
- Species: O. nebulosa

Binomial name
- Oxyna nebulosa (Wiedemann, 1817)

Synonyms
- Tephritis nebulosa Wiedemann, 1817; Oxyna femoralis Robineau-Desvoidy, 1830; Trypeta nigrofemorata Meigen, 1838; Trypeta proboscidea Loew, 1844; Oxyna corticina Rondani, 1870; Oxyna cribrina Rondani, 1870; Oxyna proboscidae Becker, 1905

Species of fly

Oxyna nebulosa is a species of fruit fly in the family Tephritidae.

== Distribution ==
United Kingdom & Finland France, Italy, Bulgaria & Ukraine, Israel.
