= Oxyna guttatofasciata =

Scientific classification
- Kingdom: Animalia
- Phylum: Arthropoda
- Clade: Pancrustacea
- Class: Insecta
- Order: Diptera
- Family: Tephritidae
- Subfamily: Tephritinae
- Tribe: Tephritini
- Genus: Oxyna
- Species: O. guttatofasciata

Binomial name
- Oxyna guttatofasciata (Loew, 1850)

Synonyms
- Trypeta guttatofasciata Loew, 1850

Species of fly

Oxyna guttatofasciata is a species of fruit fly in the family Tephritidae.

== Distribution ==
Oxyna guttatofasciata is located in: Kazakhstan, West & South East Siberia, Mongolia, and China.
