= Oxyna variabilis =

Scientific classification
- Kingdom: Animalia
- Phylum: Arthropoda
- Clade: Pancrustacea
- Class: Insecta
- Order: Diptera
- Family: Tephritidae
- Subfamily: Tephritinae
- Tribe: Tephritini
- Genus: Oxyna
- Species: O. variabilis

Binomial name
- Oxyna variabilis Chen, 1938

Synonyms
- Grandoxyna gilva Dirlbek & Dirlbek, 1971

Species of fly

Oxyna variabilis is a species of fruit fly in the family Tephritidae.

== Distribution ==
Russia, Mongolia, China.
