= Xanthomyia =

Scientific classification
- Kingdom: Animalia
- Phylum: Arthropoda
- Class: Insecta
- Order: Diptera
- Family: Tephritidae
- Subfamily: Tephritinae
- Tribe: Eutretini
- Genus: Xanthomyia; Phillips, 1923

Synonyms
- Paranoeeta Shiraki, 1933; Paracarphotricha Hendel, 1927

Genus of flies

Xanthomyia is a genus of tephritid or fruit flies in the family Tephritidae.

== Species ==
- Xanthomyia alpestris (Pokorny, 1887)
- Xanthomyia japonica (Shiraki, 1933)
- Xanthomyia nora (Doane, 1899)
- Xanthomyia platyptera (Loew, 1873)
