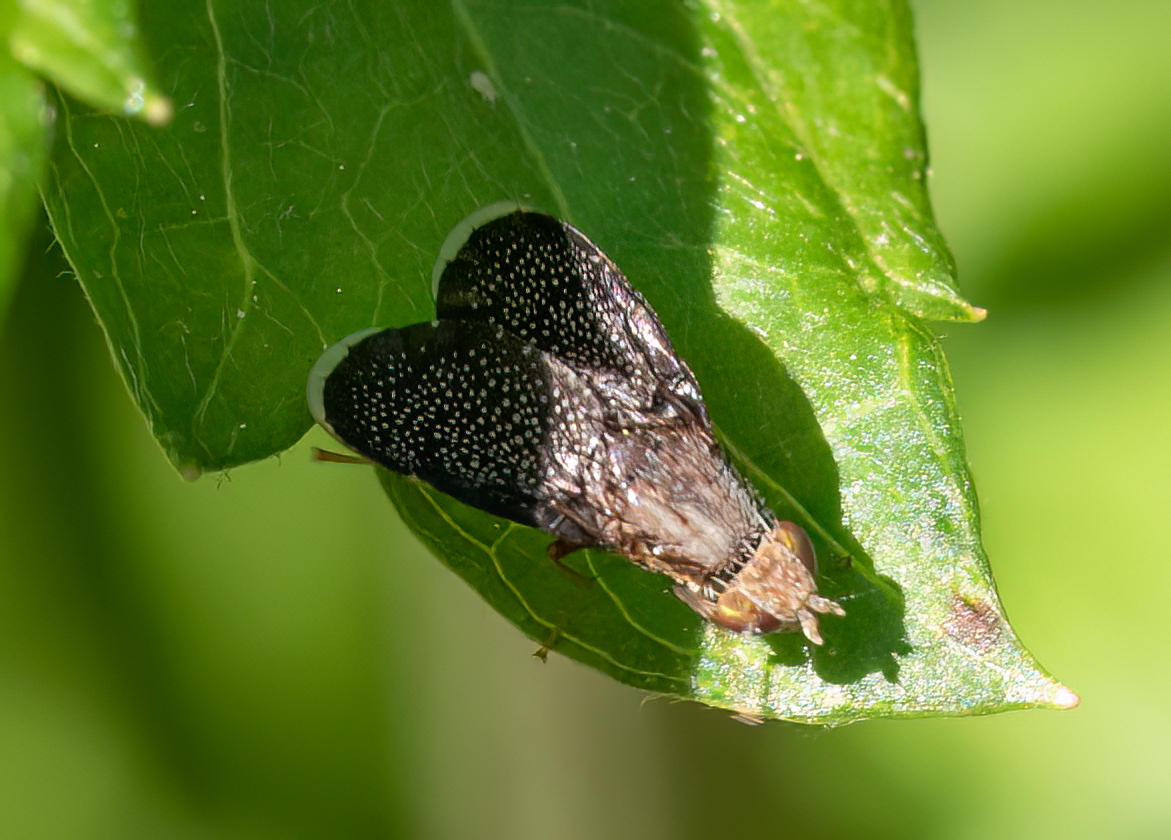
- Eutreta sp.

Scientific classification
- Kingdom: Animalia
- Phylum: Arthropoda
- Class: Insecta
- Order: Diptera
- Family: Tephritidae
- Subfamily: Tephritinae
- Tribe: Eutretini
- Genus: Eutreta; Loew, 1873

Type species
- Trypeta sparsa Wiedemann, 1830

Synonyms
- Icaria Schiner, 1868; Eustreta Woodworth, 1913; Uncaculeus Stoltzfus, 1977

= Eutreta =

Genus of flies

Eutreta is a genus of the family Tephritidae, better known as fruit flies.

== Systematics ==
Eutreta has three subgenera: Eutreta, Metatephritis and Setosigena.

These 36 species belong to the genus Eutreta:

- Eutreta aczeli Lima, 1954
- Eutreta angusta Banks, 1926
- Eutreta apicalis (Coquillett, 1904)
- Eutreta apicata Hering, 1935
- Eutreta brasiliensis Stoltzfus, 1977
- Eutreta caliptera (Say, 1830)
- Eutreta christophe (Bates, 1933)
- Eutreta coalita Blanc, 1979
- Eutreta decora Stoltzfus, 1977
- Eutreta diana (Osten Sacken, 1877)
- Eutreta distincta (Schiner, 1868)
- Eutreta divisa Stoltzfus, 1977
- Eutreta eluta Stoltzfus, 1977
- Eutreta fenestra Stoltzfus, 1977
- Eutreta fenestrata (Foote, 1960)
- Eutreta frontalis Curran, 1932
- Eutreta frosti Hering, 1938
- Eutreta hespera Banks, 1926
- Eutreta intermedia Stoltzfus, 1977
- Eutreta jamaicensis Stoltzfus, 1977
- Eutreta latipennis (Macquart, 1843)
- Eutreta longicornis Snow, 1894
- Eutreta margaritata Hendel, 1914
- Eutreta mexicana Stoltzfus, 1977
- Eutreta novaeboracensis (Fitch, 1855)
- Eutreta obliqua Stoltzfus, 1977
- Eutreta oregona Curran, 1932
- Eutreta parasparsa Blanchard, 1965
- Eutreta patagiata Wulp, 1899
- Eutreta pollinosa Curran, 1932
- Eutreta rhinophora Hering, 1937
- Eutreta rotundipennis (Loew, 1862)
- Eutreta simplex Thomas, 1914
- Eutreta sparsa (Wiedemann, 1830)
- Eutreta xanthochaeta Aldrich, 1923
