= Dictyotrypeta =

Scientific classification
- Kingdom: Animalia
- Phylum: Arthropoda
- Class: Insecta
- Order: Diptera
- Family: Tephritidae
- Subfamily: Tephritinae
- Tribe: Eutretini
- Genus: Dictyotrypeta; Hendel, 1914

Type species
- Dictyotrypeta syssema Hendel, 1914

Genus of flies

Dictyotrypeta is a genus of the family Tephritidae, better known as fruit flies.

== Species ==
- Dictyotrypeta atacta (Hendel, 1914)
- Dictyotrypeta cometa (Malloch, 1933)
- Dictyotrypeta crenulata (Wulp, 1900)
- Dictyotrypeta incisum (Wulp, 1899)
- Dictyotrypeta strobelioides (Hendel, 1914)
- Dictyotrypeta syssema Hendel, 1914
