= Polymorphomyia =

Scientific classification
- Kingdom: Animalia
- Phylum: Arthropoda
- Class: Insecta
- Order: Diptera
- Family: Tephritidae
- Subfamily: Tephritinae
- Tribe: Eutretini
- Genus: Polymorphomyia; Snow, 1894

Type species
- Polymorphomyia basilica Snow, 1894

Genus of flies

Polymorphomyia is a genus of tephritid or fruit flies in the family Tephritidae.

== Species ==
- Polymorphomyia basilica Snow, 1894
- Polymorphomyia footei Korytkowski, 1971
- Polymorphomyia pilosula Wulp, 1899
- Polymorphomyia striola (Fabricius, 1805)
- Polymorphomyia tridentata (Hendel, 1914)
