= Dracontomyia =

Scientific classification
- Kingdom: Animalia
- Phylum: Arthropoda
- Class: Insecta
- Order: Diptera
- Family: Tephritidae
- Subfamily: Tephritinae
- Tribe: Eutretini
- Genus: Dracontomyia; Becker, 1919

Type species
- Dracontomyia riveti Becker, 1919

Genus of flies

Dracontomyia is a genus of the family Tephritidae, better known as fruit flies.

== Species ==
- Dracontomyia footei Aczél, 1953
- Dracontomyia riveti Becker, 1919
