= Oxyna lutulenta =

Scientific classification
- Kingdom: Animalia
- Phylum: Arthropoda
- Clade: Pancrustacea
- Class: Insecta
- Order: Diptera
- Family: Tephritidae
- Subfamily: Tephritinae
- Tribe: Tephritini
- Genus: Oxyna
- Species: O. lutulenta

Binomial name
- Oxyna lutulenta Loew, 1869

Species of fly

Oxyna lutulenta is a species of fruit fly in the family Tephritidae.

== Distribution ==
Russia, Kazakhstan, Mongolia.
