= Cosmetothrix =

Scientific classification
- Kingdom: Animalia
- Phylum: Arthropoda
- Class: Insecta
- Order: Diptera
- Family: Tephritidae
- Subfamily: Tephritinae
- Tribe: Eutretini
- Genus: Cosmetothrix; Munro, 1952

Type species
- Afreutreta discoidalis Bezzi, 1924

Genus of flies

Cosmetothrix is a genus of tephritid or fruit flies in the family Tephritidae.

== Species ==
- Cosmetothrix discoidalis (Bezzi, 1924)
