= Oxyna fenestrata =

Scientific classification
- Kingdom: Animalia
- Phylum: Arthropoda
- Clade: Pancrustacea
- Class: Insecta
- Order: Diptera
- Family: Tephritidae
- Subfamily: Tephritinae
- Tribe: Tephritini
- Genus: Oxyna
- Species: O. fenestrata

Binomial name
- Oxyna fenestrata (Zetterstedt, 1847)

Synonyms
- Tephritis fenestrata Zetterstedt, 1847

Species of fly

Oxyna fenestrata is a species of fruit fly in the family Tephritidae.

== Distribution ==
Scandinavia.
