= Oxyna utahensis =

Scientific classification
- Kingdom: Animalia
- Phylum: Arthropoda
- Clade: Pancrustacea
- Class: Insecta
- Order: Diptera
- Family: Tephritidae
- Subfamily: Tephritinae
- Tribe: Tephritini
- Genus: Oxyna
- Species: O. utahensis

Binomial name
- Oxyna utahensis Quisenberry, 1949

Species of fly

Oxyna utahensis is a species of fruit fly in the family Tephritidae.

== Distribution ==
USA & Canada.
