= Oxyna amurensis =

Scientific classification
- Kingdom: Animalia
- Phylum: Arthropoda
- Clade: Pancrustacea
- Class: Insecta
- Order: Diptera
- Family: Tephritidae
- Subfamily: Tephritinae
- Tribe: Tephritini
- Genus: Oxyna
- Species: O. amurensis

Binomial name
- Oxyna amurensis Hendel, 1927

Synonyms
- Campiglossa intermedia Chen, 1938; Campiglossa incerta Chen, 1938

Species of fly

Oxyna amurensis is a species of fruit fly in the family Tephritidae.

== Distribution ==
Russia, China, Korea, Japan.
