= Eutreta diana =

Scientific classification
- Kingdom: Animalia
- Phylum: Arthropoda
- Clade: Pancrustacea
- Class: Insecta
- Order: Diptera
- Family: Tephritidae
- Subfamily: Tephritinae
- Tribe: Eutretini
- Genus: Eutreta
- Species: E. diana

Binomial name
- Eutreta diana (Osten-Sacken, 1877)

Synonyms
- Trypeta diana Osten Sacken, 1877; Eutreta jonesi Curran, 1932; Eutreta diana var. tricolor Snow, 1894

Species of fly

Eutreta diana is a species in the family Tephritidae, known as fruit flies in North America and picture wing flies in Europe. Females lay eggs in vegetative buds of several species and subspecies of sagebrush in western North America. Larvae induce woody galls near their oviposition site and feed on the plant internally until they mature. Adults have "pale green eyes, white-dotted black wings, and bright red abdomens" (Goeden 1990). Growth of galls coincides with spring seasonal growth of sagebrush. There is one generation per year.

== Distribution ==
Canada, United States.
