= Oxyna palpalis =

Scientific classification
- Kingdom: Animalia
- Phylum: Arthropoda
- Clade: Pancrustacea
- Class: Insecta
- Order: Diptera
- Family: Tephritidae
- Subfamily: Tephritinae
- Tribe: Tephritini
- Genus: Oxyna
- Species: O. palpalis

Binomial name
- Oxyna palpalis (Coquillett, 1904)

Synonyms
- Tephritis palpalis Coquillett, 1904

Species of fly

Oxyna palpalis is a species of fruit fly in the family Tephritidae.

== Distribution ==
USA & Mexico.
