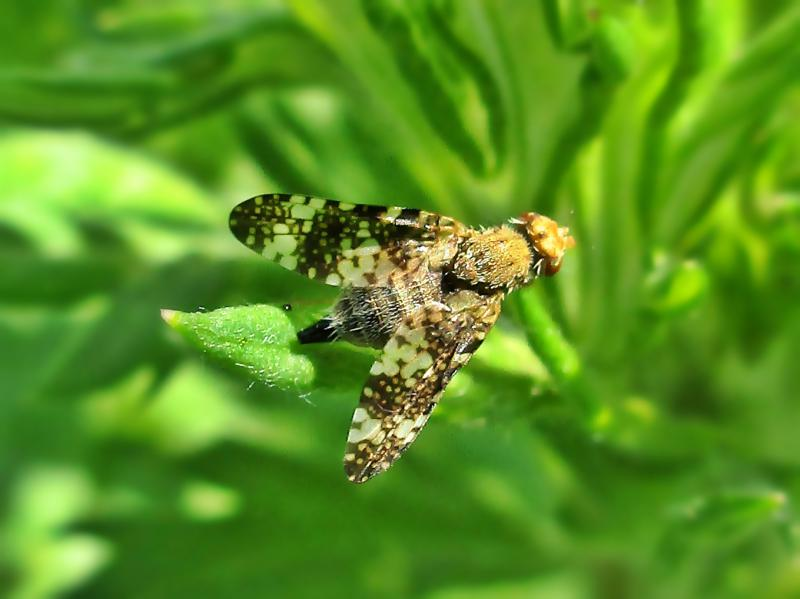
- Oxyna parietina

Scientific classification
- Kingdom: Animalia
- Phylum: Arthropoda
- Clade: Pancrustacea
- Class: Insecta
- Order: Diptera
- Family: Tephritidae
- Subfamily: Tephritinae
- Tribe: Tephritini
- Genus: Oxyna
- Species: O. parietina

Binomial name
- Oxyna parietina (Linnaeus, 1758)

Synonyms
- Musca parietina Linnaeus, 1758; Tephritis pantherina Fallén, 1820; Oxyna cinerea Robineau-Desvoidy, 1830; Tephritis fulvimaculata Shinji, 1939

= Oxyna parietina =

Species of fly

Oxyna parietina is a species of fruit fly in the family Tephritidae.

== Distribution ==
United Kingdom & Finland, South to France, Bulgaria & Kazakhstan.

== Ecology ==
Larvae develop in the stems of Artemisia vulgaris.
