= Afreutreta =

Scientific classification
- Kingdom: Animalia
- Phylum: Arthropoda
- Clade: Pancrustacea
- Class: Insecta
- Order: Diptera
- Family: Tephritidae
- Subfamily: Tephritinae
- Tribe: Eutretini
- Genus: Afreutreta; Bezzi, 1924

Type species
- Trypeta bipunctata Loew, 1869

Genus of flies

Afreutreta is a genus of tephritid or fruit flies in the family Tephritidae.

== Species ==
- Afreutreta bipunctata (Loew, 1869)
