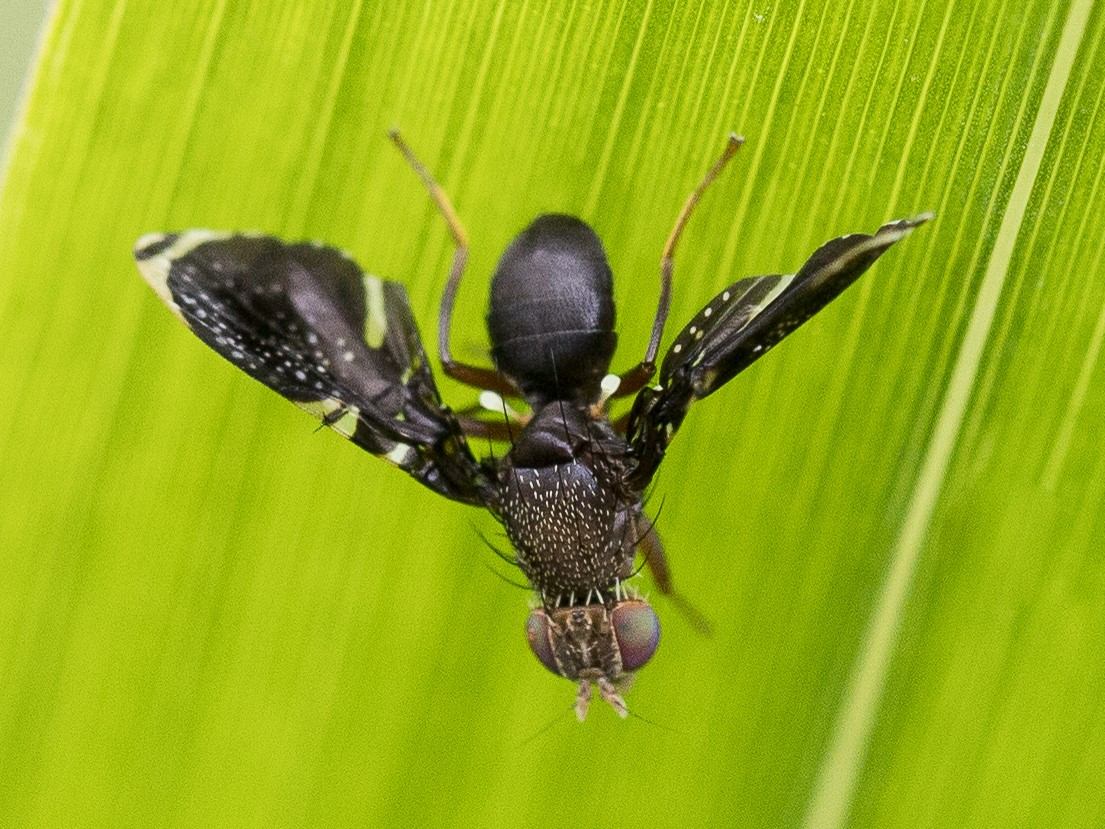
- Pseudeutreta anteapicalis

Scientific classification
- Kingdom: Animalia
- Phylum: Arthropoda
- Clade: Pancrustacea
- Class: Insecta
- Order: Diptera
- Family: Tephritidae
- Subfamily: Tephritinae
- Tribe: Eutretini
- Genus: Pseudeutreta; Hendel, 1914

Type species
- Trypeta adspersa Wiedemann, 1830

= Pseudeutreta =

Genus of flies

Pseudeutreta is a genus of tephritid or fruit flies in the family Tephritidae.

== Species ==
- Pseudeutreta adspersa (Wiedemann, 1830)
- Pseudeutreta anteapicalis Hendel, 1914
- Pseudeutreta baccharidis (Kieffer & Jörgensen, 1910)
- Pseudeutreta falcigera (Kieffer & Jörgensen, 1910)
- Pseudeutreta ilonae (Aczél, 1953)
- Pseudeutreta ligularis Bates, 1933
- Pseudeutreta lunulata (Macquart, 1851)
- Pseudeutreta nobilis (Aczél, 1953)
- Pseudeutreta orfilai (Aczél, 1953)
- Pseudeutreta paragranum Hering, 1942
- Pseudeutreta quadrigutta (Walker, 1853)
