= Oxyna aterrima =

Scientific classification
- Kingdom: Animalia
- Phylum: Arthropoda
- Clade: Pancrustacea
- Class: Insecta
- Order: Diptera
- Family: Tephritidae
- Subfamily: Tephritinae
- Tribe: Tephritini
- Genus: Oxyna
- Species: O. aterrima

Binomial name
- Oxyna aterrima (Doane, 1899)

Synonyms
- Eurosta aterrima Doane, 1899

Species of fly

Oxyna aterrima is a species of fruit fly in the family Tephritidae.

== Distribution ==
Canada, United States.
