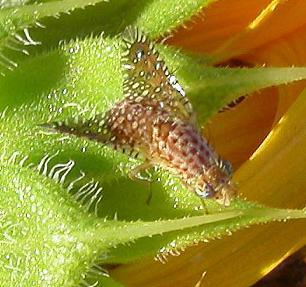
- Paracantha cultaris

Scientific classification
- Kingdom: Animalia
- Phylum: Arthropoda
- Class: Insecta
- Order: Diptera
- Family: Tephritidae
- Subfamily: Tephritinae
- Tribe: Eutretini

= Eutretini =

Tribe of flies

Eutretini is a tribe of tephritid or fruit flies in the family Tephritidae.

== Genera ==
- Afreutreta Bezzi, 1924
- Cosmetothrix Loew, 1869
- Cryptotreta Blanc & Foote, 1961
- Dictyotrypeta Hendel, 1914
- Dracontomyia Becker, 1919
- Eutreta Loew, 1873
- Merzomyia Korneyev, 1996
- Paracantha Coquillett, 1899
- Polymorphomyia Snow, 1894
- Pseudeutreta Hendel, 1914
- Rachiptera Bigot, 1859
- Stenopa Loew, 1873
- Tarchonanthea Freidberg & Kaplan, 1993
- Xanthomyia Phillips, 1923
