= Neotaracia imox =

Scientific classification
- Kingdom: Animalia
- Phylum: Arthropoda
- Class: Insecta
- Order: Diptera
- Family: Tephritidae
- Subfamily: Tephritinae
- Tribe: Acrotaeniini
- Genus: Neotaracia
- Species: N. imox

Binomial name
- Neotaracia imox (Bates, 1934)

Synonyms
- Acrotaenia imox Bates, 1934

Species of fly

Neotaracia imox is a species of tephritid or fruit flies in the genus Neotaracia of the family Tephritidae.

== Distribution ==
Mexico, South to Colombia & Ecuador, East to Venezuela & Trinidad.
