= Baryplegma pertusum =

Scientific classification
- Kingdom: Animalia
- Phylum: Arthropoda
- Class: Insecta
- Order: Diptera
- Family: Tephritidae
- Subfamily: Tephritinae
- Tribe: Acrotaeniini
- Genus: Baryplegma
- Species: B. pertusum

Binomial name
- Baryplegma pertusum (Bates, 1934)

Synonyms
- Pseudacrotaenia pertusa Bates, 1934

Species of fly

Baryplegma pertusum is a species of tephritid or fruit flies in the genus Baryplegma of the family Tephritidae.

== Distribution ==
Mexico, Belize, Guatemala, Nicaragua, Costa Rica, Panama, Colombia, Venezuela.
