= Caenoriata pertinax =

Scientific classification
- Kingdom: Animalia
- Phylum: Arthropoda
- Class: Insecta
- Order: Diptera
- Family: Tephritidae
- Subfamily: Tephritinae
- Tribe: Acrotaeniini
- Genus: Caenoriata
- Species: C. pertinax

Binomial name
- Caenoriata pertinax (Bates, 1934)

Synonyms
- Acrotaenia pertinax Bates, 1934

Species of fly

Caenoriata pertinax is a species of tephritid or fruit flies in the genus Caenoriata of the family Tephritidae.

== Distribution ==
Brazil.
