= Tetrasarus =

Scientific classification
- Kingdom: Animalia
- Phylum: Arthropoda
- Class: Insecta
- Order: Coleoptera
- Suborder: Polyphaga
- Infraorder: Cucujiformia
- Family: Cerambycidae
- Tribe: Acanthoderini
- Genus: Tetrasarus

Genus of beetles

Tetrasarus is a genus of beetles in the family Cerambycidae, containing the following species:

== Species ==
- T. albescens Bates, 1880
- T. callistus Bates, 1880
- T. formosus Bates, 1885
- T. inops Bates, 1880
- T. lezamai Chemsak & Hovore, 2002
- T. lineatus Brèthes, 1920
- T. nanus Chemsak & Hovore, 2002
- T. pictulus Bates, 1880
- T. plato Bates, 1885
- T. quadriscopulatus (Thomson, 1868)
- T. similis Chemsak & Hovore, 2002
