= Tomoplagia obliqua =

Scientific classification
- Kingdom: Animalia
- Phylum: Arthropoda
- Clade: Pancrustacea
- Class: Insecta
- Order: Diptera
- Family: Tephritidae
- Subfamily: Tephritinae
- Tribe: Acrotaeniini
- Genus: Tomoplagia
- Species: T. obliqua

Binomial name
- Tomoplagia obliqua (Say, 1830)

Synonyms
- Trypeta obliqua Say, 1830

Species of fly

Tomoplagia obliqua is a species of tephritid or fruit flies in the genus Tomoplagia of the family Tephritidae.

== Distribution ==
United States, Costa Rica, Bahamas & Cuba.

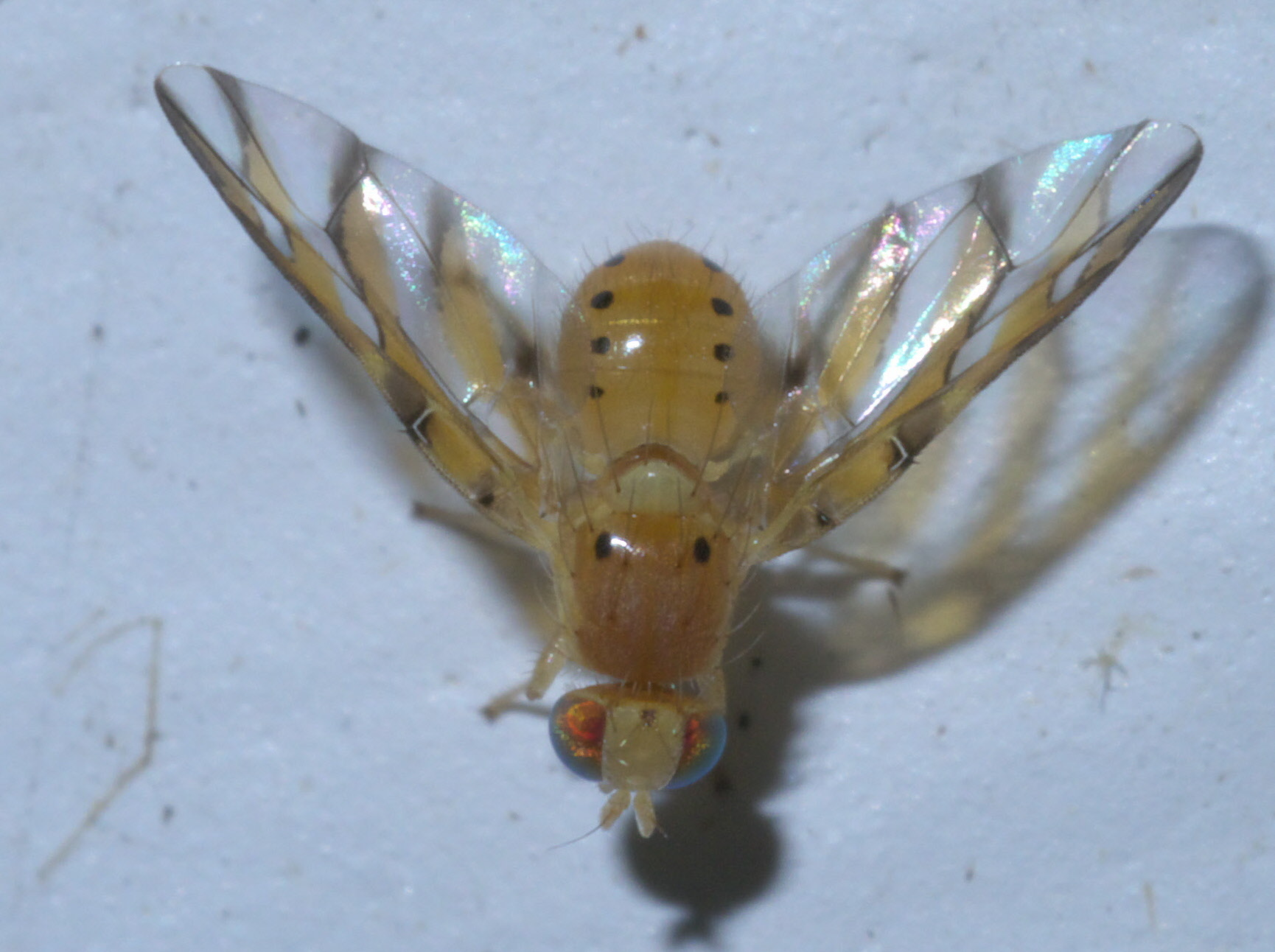
