= Acrotaenia tarsata =

Scientific classification
- Kingdom: Animalia
- Phylum: Arthropoda
- Class: Insecta
- Order: Diptera
- Family: Tephritidae
- Subfamily: Tephritinae
- Tribe: Acrotaeniini
- Genus: Acrotaenia
- Species: A. tarsata

Binomial name
- Acrotaenia tarsata Wulp, 1899

Species of fly

Acrotaenia tarsata is a species of tephritid or fruit flies in the genus Acrotaenia of the family Tephritidae.

== Distribution ==
A. tarsata is found in Mexico and Belize.
