= Baryplegma coeleste =

Scientific classification
- Kingdom: Animalia
- Phylum: Arthropoda
- Class: Insecta
- Order: Diptera
- Family: Tephritidae
- Subfamily: Tephritinae
- Tribe: Acrotaeniini
- Genus: Baryplegma
- Species: B. coeleste

Binomial name
- Baryplegma coeleste (Hendel, 1914)

Synonyms
- Acrotaenia coelestis Hendel, 1914

Species of fly

Baryplegma coeleste is a species of tephritid or fruit flies in the genus Baryplegma of the family Tephritidae.

== Distribution ==
Bolivia, Paraguay, Brazil.
