= Tetreuaresta punctipennata =

Scientific classification
- Kingdom: Animalia
- Phylum: Arthropoda
- Class: Insecta
- Order: Diptera
- Family: Tephritidae
- Subfamily: Tephritinae
- Tribe: Acrotaeniini
- Genus: Tetreuaresta
- Species: T. punctipennata

Binomial name
- Tetreuaresta punctipennata Hering, 1942

Synonyms
- Tetreuaresta punctipennata Hering, 1942

Species of fly

Tetreuaresta punctipennata is a species of tephritid or fruit flies in the genus Tetreuaresta of the family Tephritidae.

== Distribution ==
Costa Rica.
