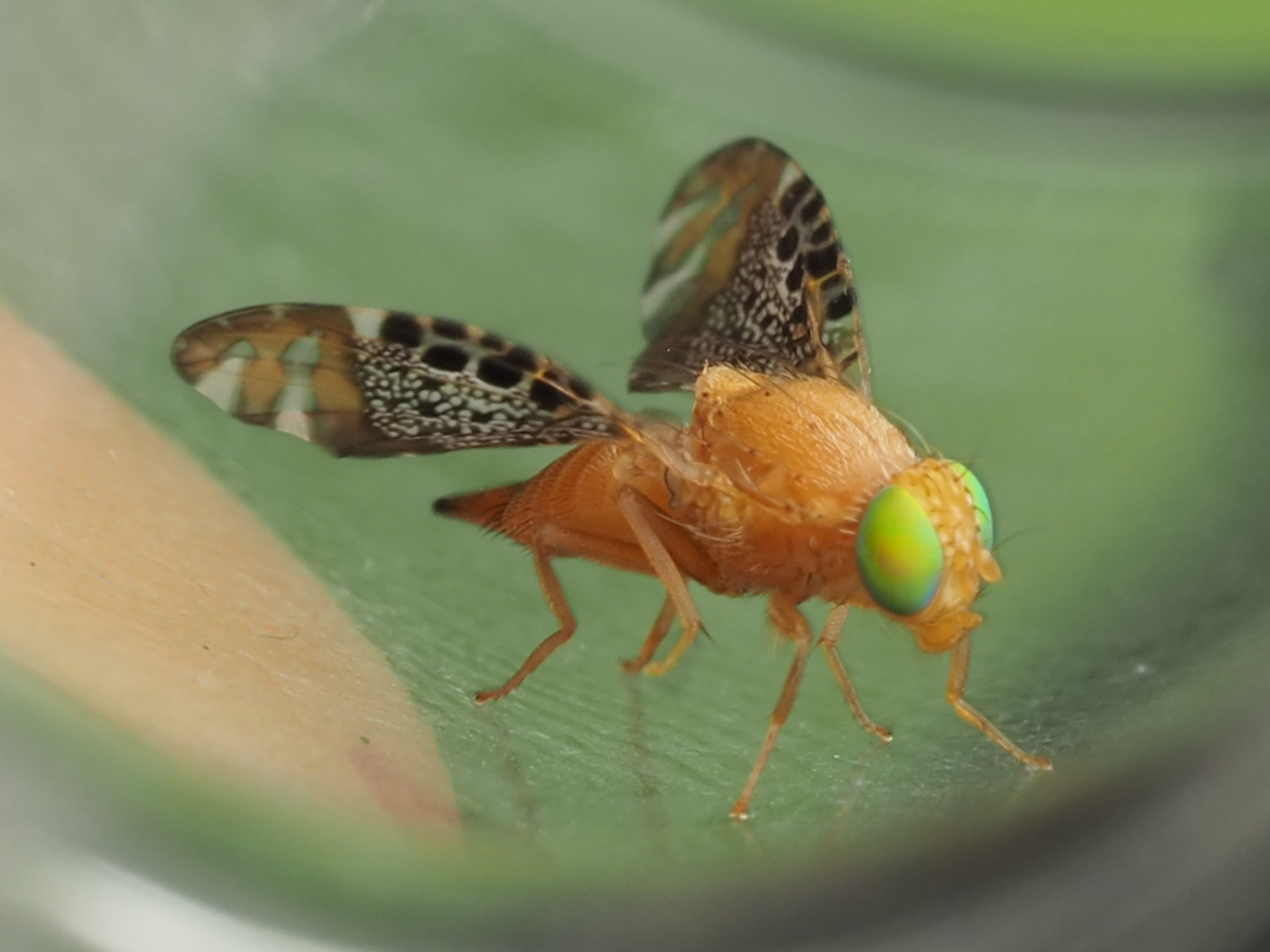

Scientific classification
- Kingdom: Animalia
- Phylum: Arthropoda
- Clade: Pancrustacea
- Class: Insecta
- Order: Diptera
- Family: Tephritidae
- Subfamily: Tephritinae
- Tribe: Acrotaeniini
- Genus: Acrotaenia
- Species: A. testudinea

Binomial name
- Acrotaenia testudinea (Loew, 1873)

Synonyms
- Trypeta testudinea Loew, 1873

= Acrotaenia testudinea =

Species of fly

Acrotaenia testudinea is a species of tephritid or fruit fly in the family Tephritidae.

== Distribution ==
Acrotaenia testudinea is found in the United States and the Greater Antilles.
