= Acrotaenia otopappi =

Scientific classification
- Kingdom: Animalia
- Phylum: Arthropoda
- Class: Insecta
- Order: Diptera
- Family: Tephritidae
- Subfamily: Tephritinae
- Tribe: Acrotaeniini
- Genus: Acrotaenia
- Species: A. otopappi

Binomial name
- Acrotaenia otopappi Doane, 1899

Species of fly

Acrotaenia otopappi is a species of tephritid or fruit flies in the genus Acrotaenia of the family Tephritidae.

== Distribution ==
A. otopappi is found in Mexico.
