= Euarestopsis paupera =

Scientific classification
- Kingdom: Animalia
- Phylum: Arthropoda
- Class: Insecta
- Order: Diptera
- Family: Tephritidae
- Subfamily: Tephritinae
- Tribe: Acrotaeniini
- Genus: Euarestopsis
- Species: E. paupera

Binomial name
- Euarestopsis paupera Hering, 1937

Species of fly

Euarestopsis paupera is a species of tephritid or fruit flies in the genus Euarestopsis of the family Tephritidae.

== Distribution ==
Costa Rica.
