= Baryplegma forsteri =

Scientific classification
- Kingdom: Animalia
- Phylum: Arthropoda
- Clade: Pancrustacea
- Class: Insecta
- Order: Diptera
- Family: Tephritidae
- Subfamily: Tephritinae
- Tribe: Acrotaeniini
- Genus: Baryplegma
- Species: B. forsteri

Binomial name
- Baryplegma forsteri (Hering, 1961)

Synonyms
- Pseudacrotaenia forsteri Hering, 1961

Species of fly

Baryplegma forsteri is a species of tephritid or fruit flies in the genus Baryplegma of the family Tephritidae.

== Distribution ==
Bolivia.
