= Baryplegma vespillo =

Scientific classification
- Kingdom: Animalia
- Phylum: Arthropoda
- Clade: Pancrustacea
- Class: Insecta
- Order: Diptera
- Family: Tephritidae
- Subfamily: Tephritinae
- Tribe: Acrotaeniini
- Genus: Baryplegma
- Species: B. vespillo

Binomial name
- Baryplegma vespillo (Schiner, 1868)

Synonyms
- Carphotricha vespillo Schiner, 1868

Species of fly

Baryplegma vespillo is a species of tephritid fruit flies in the genus Baryplegma of the family Tephritidae.

== Distribution ==
Venezuela, Peru, Bolivia.
