= Tomoplagia discolor =

Scientific classification
- Kingdom: Animalia
- Phylum: Arthropoda
- Clade: Pancrustacea
- Class: Insecta
- Order: Diptera
- Family: Tephritidae
- Subfamily: Tephritinae
- Tribe: Acrotaeniini
- Genus: Tomoplagia
- Species: T. discolor

Binomial name
- Tomoplagia discolor (Loew, 1862)

Synonyms
- Trypeta discolor Loew, 1862

Species of fly

Tomoplagia discolor is a species of tephritid or fruit flies in the genus Tomoplagia of the family Tephritidae.

== Distribution ==
Cuba, Puerto Rico.
