= Baryplegma pseudovespillo =

Scientific classification
- Kingdom: Animalia
- Phylum: Arthropoda
- Class: Insecta
- Order: Diptera
- Family: Tephritidae
- Subfamily: Tephritinae
- Tribe: Acrotaeniini
- Genus: Baryplegma
- Species: B. pseudovespillo

Binomial name
- Baryplegma pseudovespillo (Hendel, 1914)

Synonyms
- Acrotaenia pseudovespillo Hendel, 1914

Species of fly

Baryplegma pseudovespillo is a species of tephritid or fruit flies in the genus Baryplegma of the family Tephritidae.

== Distribution ==
Peru, Bolivia.
