= Tetreuaresta =

Scientific classification
- Kingdom: Animalia
- Phylum: Arthropoda
- Class: Insecta
- Order: Diptera
- Family: Tephritidae
- Subfamily: Tephritinae
- Tribe: Acrotaeniini
- Genus: Tetreuaresta; Hendel, 1928

Type species
- Trypeta obscuriventris Loew, 1873

Genus of flies

Tetreuaresta is a genus of tephritid or fruit flies in the family Tephritidae.

== Species ==
- Tetreuaresta audax (Giglio-Tos, 1893)
- Tetreuaresta bartica Bates, 1933
- Tetreuaresta copiosa Hering, 1942
- Tetreuaresta deleta Hering, 1942
- Tetreuaresta ellipa (Hendel, 1914)
- Tetreuaresta guttata (Macquart, 1846)
- Tetreuaresta heringi Norrbom, 1999
- Tetreuaresta lata Hering, 1942
- Tetreuaresta latipennis (Townsend, 1893)
- Tetreuaresta myrtis (Hendel, 1914)
- Tetreuaresta obscuriventris (Loew, 1873)
- Tetreuaresta phthonera (Hendel, 1914)
- Tetreuaresta plaumanni Hering, 1953
- Tetreuaresta punctipennata Hering, 1942
- Tetreuaresta rufula (Wulp, 1900)
- Tetreuaresta spectabilis (Loew, 1873)
- Tetreuaresta timida (Loew, 1862)
