= Neotaracia plaumanni =

Scientific classification
- Kingdom: Animalia
- Phylum: Arthropoda
- Class: Insecta
- Order: Diptera
- Family: Tephritidae
- Subfamily: Tephritinae
- Tribe: Acrotaeniini
- Genus: Neotaracia
- Species: N. plaumanni

Binomial name
- Neotaracia plaumanni (Hering, 1938)

Synonyms
- Acrotaenia plaumanni Hering, 1938

Species of fly

Neotaracia plaumanni is a species of tephritid or fruit flies in the genus Neotaracia of the family Tephritidae.

== Distribution ==
N. plaumanni is found in Paraguay, Brazil and Argentina.
