= Tetrasarus callistus =

Scientific classification
- Kingdom: Animalia
- Phylum: Arthropoda
- Class: Insecta
- Order: Coleoptera
- Suborder: Polyphaga
- Infraorder: Cucujiformia
- Family: Cerambycidae
- Genus: Tetrasarus
- Species: T. callistus

Binomial name
- Tetrasarus callistus Bates, 1880

Species of beetle

Tetrasarus callistus is a species of beetle in the family Cerambycidae. It was described by Bates in 1880.
