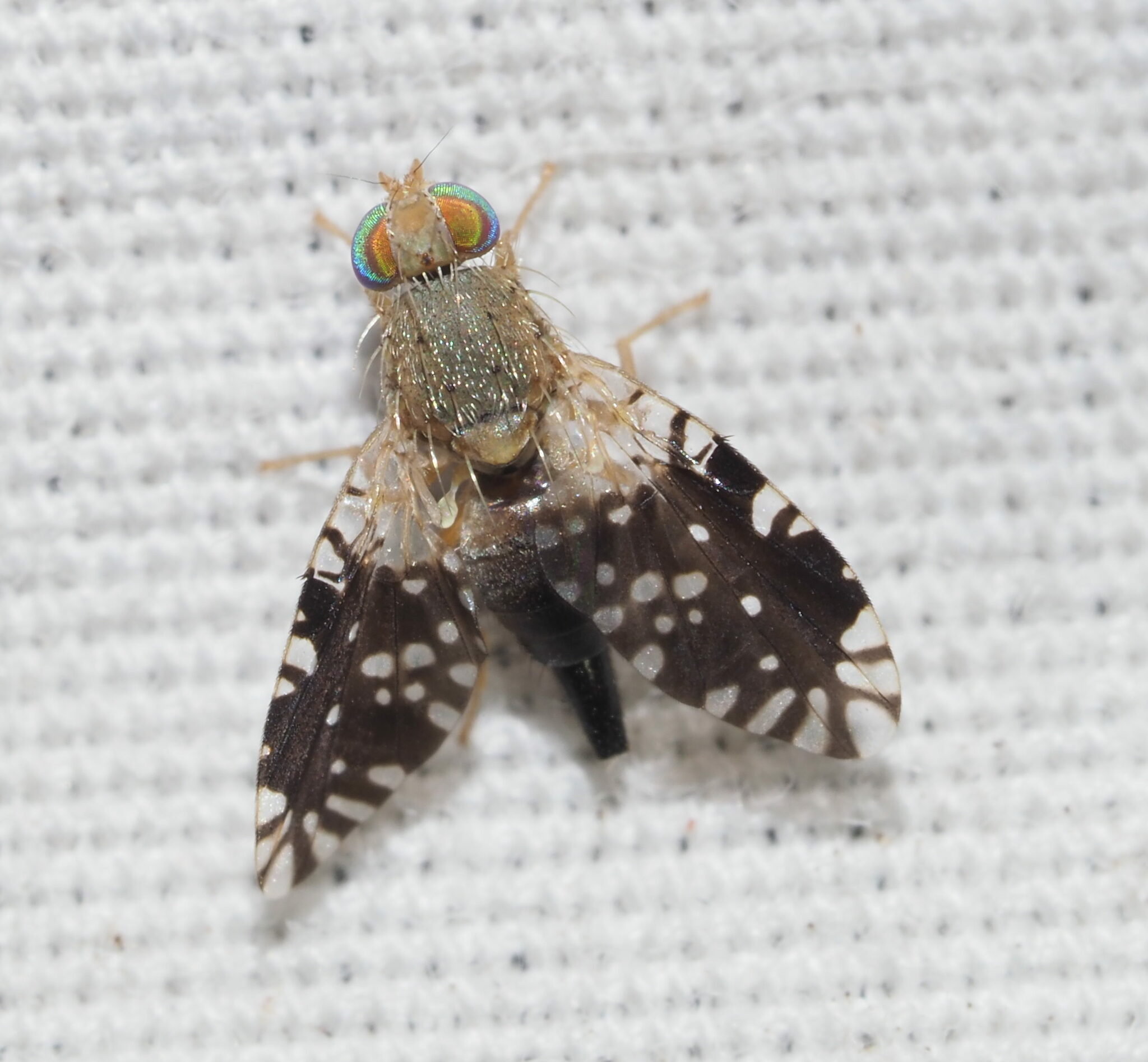

Scientific classification
- Kingdom: Animalia
- Phylum: Arthropoda
- Class: Insecta
- Order: Diptera
- Family: Tephritidae
- Subfamily: Tephritinae
- Tribe: Acrotaeniini
- Genus: Tetreuaresta
- Species: T. obscuriventris

Binomial name
- Tetreuaresta obscuriventris Loew, 1873

Synonyms
- Trypeta obscuriventris Loew, 1873; Euaresta catharinensis Enderlein, 1911; Euaresta columbiana Enderlein, 1911

= Tetreuaresta obscuriventris =

Species of fly

Tetreuaresta obscuriventris is a species of tephritid or fruit flies in the genus Tetreuaresta of the family Tephritidae.

== Distribution ==
Greater Antilles, Colombia, Brazil. Introduced to Hawaii, Fiji, Tonga.
