= Acrotaeniostola megispilota =

Scientific classification
- Kingdom: Animalia
- Phylum: Arthropoda
- Class: Insecta
- Order: Diptera
- Family: Tephritidae
- Subfamily: Tephritinae
- Tribe: Acrotaeniini
- Genus: Acrotaeniostola
- Species: A. megispilota

Binomial name
- Acrotaeniostola megispilota Hardy, 1974

Species of fly

Acrotaeniostola megispilota is a species of tephritid or fruit flies in the genus Acrotaeniostola of the family Tephritidae.

== Distribution ==
It has been found in the Philippines.
