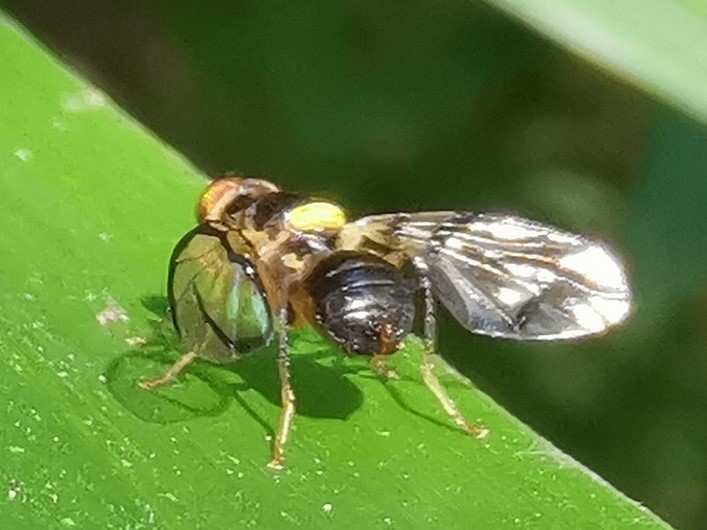

Scientific classification
- Kingdom: Animalia
- Phylum: Arthropoda
- Class: Insecta
- Order: Diptera
- Family: Tephritidae
- Subfamily: Tephritinae
- Tribe: Acrotaeniini
- Genus: Acrotaeniostola
- Species: A. spiralis

Binomial name
- Acrotaeniostola spiralis Munro, 1935

= Acrotaeniostola spiralis =

Species of fly

Acrotaeniostola spiralis is a species of tephritid or fruit flies in the family Tephritidae.

== Distribution ==
Bangladesh, Laos, Malaysia, Indonesia.
