= Tetreuaresta audax =

Scientific classification
- Kingdom: Animalia
- Phylum: Arthropoda
- Class: Insecta
- Order: Diptera
- Family: Tephritidae
- Subfamily: Tephritinae
- Tribe: Acrotaeniini
- Genus: Tetreuaresta
- Species: T. audax

Binomial name
- Tetreuaresta audax (Giglio-Tos, 1893)

Synonyms
- Euaresta audax Giglio-Tos, 1893

Species of fly

Tetreuaresta audax is a species of tephritid or fruit flies in the genus Tetreuaresta of the family Tephritidae.

== Distribution ==
Mexico.
