= Tomoplagia jonasi =

Scientific classification
- Kingdom: Animalia
- Phylum: Arthropoda
- Clade: Pancrustacea
- Class: Insecta
- Order: Diptera
- Family: Tephritidae
- Subfamily: Tephritinae
- Tribe: Acrotaeniini
- Genus: Tomoplagia
- Species: T. jonasi

Binomial name
- Tomoplagia jonasi (Lutz & Lima, 1918)

Synonyms
- Plagiotoma jonasi Lutz & Lima, 1918

Species of fly

Tomoplagia jonasi is a species of tephritid or fruit flies in the genus Tomoplagia of the family Tephritidae.

== Distribution ==
Brazil.
