= Baryplegma vulpianum =

Scientific classification
- Kingdom: Animalia
- Phylum: Arthropoda
- Clade: Pancrustacea
- Class: Insecta
- Order: Diptera
- Family: Tephritidae
- Subfamily: Tephritinae
- Tribe: Acrotaeniini
- Genus: Baryplegma
- Species: B. vulpianum

Binomial name
- Baryplegma vulpianum Enderlein, 1911

Synonyms
- Baryplegma vulpiana Enderlein, 1911; Baryplegma wulpiana Hendel, 1914

Species of fly

Baryplegma vulpianum is a species of tephritid or fruit flies in the genus Baryplegma of the family Tephritidae.

== Distribution ==
Costa Rica.
