= Tomoplagia pura =

Scientific classification
- Kingdom: Animalia
- Phylum: Arthropoda
- Clade: Pancrustacea
- Class: Insecta
- Order: Diptera
- Family: Tephritidae
- Subfamily: Tephritinae
- Tribe: Acrotaeniini
- Genus: Tomoplagia
- Species: T. pura

Binomial name
- Tomoplagia pura (Curran, 1931)

Synonyms
- Plagiotoma pura Curran, 1931

Species of fly

Tomoplagia pura is a species of tephritid or fruit flies in the genus Tomoplagia of the family Tephritidae.

== Distribution ==
Cuba, Puerto Rico.
