= Neotaracia =

Scientific classification
- Kingdom: Animalia
- Phylum: Arthropoda
- Class: Insecta
- Order: Diptera
- Family: Tephritidae
- Subfamily: Tephritinae
- Tribe: Acrotaeniini
- Genus: Neotaracia; Foote, 1978

Type species
- Acrotaenia imox Bates, 1934

Genus of flies

Neotaracia is a genus of tephritid or fruit flies in the family Tephritidae.

== Species ==
- Neotaracia imox (Bates, 1934)
- Neotaracia plaumanni (Hering, 1938)
- Neotaracia unimacula Foote, 1979
