= Caenoriata =

Scientific classification
- Kingdom: Animalia
- Phylum: Arthropoda
- Class: Insecta
- Order: Diptera
- Family: Tephritidae
- Subfamily: Tephritinae
- Tribe: Acrotaeniini
- Genus: Caenoriata; Foote, 1978

Type species
- Acrotaenia pertinax Bates, 1934

Genus of flies

Caenoriata is a genus of tephritid or fruit flies in the family Tephritidae.

== Species ==
- Caenoriata pertinax (Bates, 1934)
