= Tetrasarus plato =

Scientific classification
- Kingdom: Animalia
- Phylum: Arthropoda
- Class: Insecta
- Order: Coleoptera
- Suborder: Polyphaga
- Infraorder: Cucujiformia
- Family: Cerambycidae
- Genus: Tetrasarus
- Species: T. plato

Binomial name
- Tetrasarus plato Bates, 1885

Species of beetle

Tetrasarus plato is a species of beetle in the family Cerambycidae. It was described by Bates in 1885.
