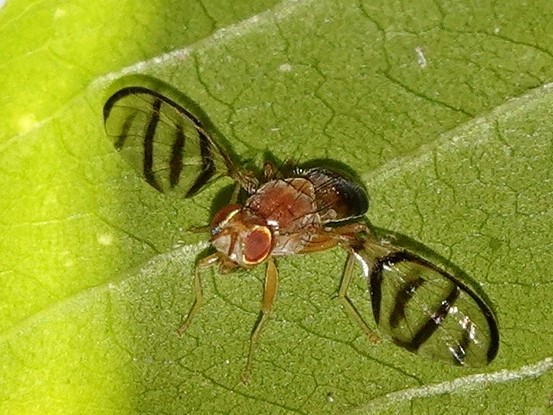

Scientific classification
- Kingdom: Animalia
- Phylum: Arthropoda
- Class: Insecta
- Order: Diptera
- Family: Tephritidae
- Subfamily: Tephritinae
- Tribe: Acrotaeniini
- Genus: Acrotaeniostola
- Species: A. sexvittata

Binomial name
- Acrotaeniostola sexvittata Hendel, 1914

Synonyms
- Trypeta scutellaris Matsumura, 1916

= Acrotaeniostola sexvittata =

Species of fly

Acrotaeniostola sexvittata is a species of tephritid or fruit flies in the family Tephritidae.

== Distribution ==
Korea, Japan, Taiwan.
