= Baryplegma apiatum =

Scientific classification
- Kingdom: Animalia
- Phylum: Arthropoda
- Class: Insecta
- Order: Diptera
- Family: Tephritidae
- Subfamily: Tephritinae
- Tribe: Acrotaeniini
- Genus: Baryplegma
- Species: B. apiatum

Binomial name
- Baryplegma apiatum (Wulp, 1899)

Synonyms
- Acrotaenia apiata Wulp, 1899

Species of fly

Baryplegma apiatum is a species of tephritid or fruit flies in the genus Baryplegma of the family Tephritidae.

== Distribution ==
Mexico.
