= Acrotaeniostola quinaria =

Scientific classification
- Kingdom: Animalia
- Phylum: Arthropoda
- Class: Insecta
- Order: Diptera
- Family: Tephritidae
- Subfamily: Tephritinae
- Tribe: Acrotaeniini
- Genus: Acrotaeniostola
- Species: A. quinaria

Binomial name
- Acrotaeniostola quinaria (Coquillett, 1910)

Synonyms
- Trypeta quinaria Coquillett, 1910

Species of fly

Acrotaeniostola quinaria is a species of tephritid or fruit flies in the genus Acrotaeniostola of the family Tephritidae.

== Distribution ==
Hong Kong.
