= Acrotaeniostola extorris =

Scientific classification
- Kingdom: Animalia
- Phylum: Arthropoda
- Class: Insecta
- Order: Diptera
- Family: Tephritidae
- Subfamily: Tephritinae
- Tribe: Acrotaeniini
- Genus: Acrotaeniostola
- Species: A. extorris

Binomial name
- Acrotaeniostola extorris Hering, 1942

Species of fly

Acrotaeniostola extorris is a species of tephritid or fruit flies in the genus Acrotaeniostola of the family Tephritidae.

== Distribution ==
Indonesia.
