= Baryplegma ricavelatum =

Scientific classification
- Kingdom: Animalia
- Phylum: Arthropoda
- Class: Insecta
- Order: Diptera
- Family: Tephritidae
- Subfamily: Tephritinae
- Tribe: Acrotaeniini
- Genus: Baryplegma
- Species: B. ricavelatum

Binomial name
- Baryplegma ricavelatum (Hendel, 1914)

Synonyms
- Acrotaenia ricavelata Hendel, 1914

Species of fly

Baryplegma ricavelatum is a species of tephritid or fruit flies in the genus Baryplegma of the family Tephritidae.

== Distribution ==
Baryplegma ricavelatum live in Peru.
