= Pseudopolionota radians =

Scientific classification
- Kingdom: Animalia
- Phylum: Arthropoda
- Class: Insecta
- Order: Diptera
- Family: Tephritidae
- Subfamily: Tephritinae
- Tribe: Acrotaeniini
- Genus: Pseudopolionota
- Species: P. radians

Binomial name
- Pseudopolionota radians Lima 1935

Synonyms
- Pseudopolionota radicans Aczél, 1950

Species of fly

Pseudopolionota radians is a species of tephritid or fruit flies in the genus Pseudopolionota of the family Tephritidae.

== Distribution ==
Brazil.
