= Baryplegma =

Scientific classification
- Kingdom: Animalia
- Phylum: Arthropoda
- Class: Insecta
- Order: Diptera
- Family: Tephritidae
- Subfamily: Tephritinae
- Tribe: Acrotaeniini
- Genus: Baryplegma; Wulp, 1899

Type species
- Baryplegma gilva Wulp, 1899

Synonyms
- Baryphlegma Williston, 1908; Barpleygma Coquillett, 1910; Pseudacrotaenia Hendel, 1914

Genus of flies

Baryplegma is a genus of tephritid or fruit flies in the family Tephritidae.

== Species ==
- Baryplegma apiatum (Wulp, 1899)
- Baryplegma breviradiatum (Hendel, 1914)
- Baryplegma coeleste (Hendel, 1914)
- Baryplegma forsteri (Hering, 1961)
- Baryplegma gilvum Wulp, 1899
- Baryplegma pertusum (Bates, 1934)
- Baryplegma pseudovespillo (Hendel, 1914)
- Baryplegma ricavelatum (Hendel, 1914)
- Baryplegma rusticum (Bates, 1934)
- Baryplegma vespillo (Schiner, 1868)
- Baryplegma vulpianum Enderlein, 1911
