= Acrotaeniacantha radiosa =

Scientific classification
- Kingdom: Animalia
- Phylum: Arthropoda
- Class: Insecta
- Order: Diptera
- Family: Tephritidae
- Subfamily: Tephritinae
- Tribe: Acrotaeniini
- Genus: Acrotaeniacantha
- Species: A. radiosa

Binomial name
- Acrotaeniacantha radiosa Hendel, 1939

Species of fly

Acrotaeniacantha radiosa is a species of tephritid or fruit flies in the genus Acrotaeniacantha of the family Tephritidae.

== Distribution ==
Venezuela.
