= Tomoplagia costalimai =

Scientific classification
- Kingdom: Animalia
- Phylum: Arthropoda
- Clade: Pancrustacea
- Class: Insecta
- Order: Diptera
- Family: Tephritidae
- Subfamily: Tephritinae
- Tribe: Acrotaeniini
- Genus: Tomoplagia
- Species: T. costalimai

Binomial name
- Tomoplagia costalimai Aczél, 1955

Synonyms
- Tomoplagia costalimai Aczél, 1955; Tomoplagia costalimai Hayward, 1941; Tomoplagia distincta Hayward, 1942

Species of fly

Tomoplagia costalimai is a species of tephritid or fruit flies in the genus Tomoplagia of the family Tephritidae.

== Distribution ==
Brazil.
