= Tetreuaresta timida =

Scientific classification
- Kingdom: Animalia
- Phylum: Arthropoda
- Class: Insecta
- Order: Diptera
- Family: Tephritidae
- Subfamily: Tephritinae
- Tribe: Acrotaeniini
- Genus: Tetreuaresta
- Species: T. timida

Binomial name
- Tetreuaresta timida (Loew, 1862)

Synonyms
- Trypeta timida Loew, 1862

Species of fly

Tetreuaresta timida is a species of tephritid or fruit flies in the genus Tetreuaresta of the family Tephritidae.

== Distribution ==
Mexico, Costa Rica.
