= Acrotaeniostola hoenei =

Scientific classification
- Kingdom: Animalia
- Phylum: Arthropoda
- Class: Insecta
- Order: Diptera
- Family: Tephritidae
- Subfamily: Tephritinae
- Tribe: Acrotaeniini
- Genus: Acrotaeniostola
- Species: A. hoenei

Binomial name
- Acrotaeniostola hoenei Hering, 1936

Synonyms
- Acrotaeniostola henei Hering, 1936; Acrotaeniostola hoenei ssp. quadrivittata Chen, 1948

Species of fly

Acrotaeniostola hoenei is a species of tephritid or fruit flies in the genus Acrotaeniostola of the family Tephritidae.

== Distribution ==
China.
