= Neotaracia unimacula =

Scientific classification
- Kingdom: Animalia
- Phylum: Arthropoda
- Class: Insecta
- Order: Diptera
- Family: Tephritidae
- Subfamily: Tephritinae
- Tribe: Acrotaeniini
- Genus: Neotaracia
- Species: N. unimacula

Binomial name
- Neotaracia unimacula Foote, 1979

Synonyms
- Acrotaenia unimacula Foote, 1979

Species of fly

Neotaracia unimacula is a species of tephritid or fruit flies in the genus Neotaracia of the family Tephritidae.

== Distribution ==
Mexico South to Costa Rica.
