= Tomoplagia quinquefasciata =

Scientific classification
- Kingdom: Animalia
- Phylum: Arthropoda
- Clade: Pancrustacea
- Class: Insecta
- Order: Diptera
- Family: Tephritidae
- Subfamily: Tephritinae
- Tribe: Acrotaeniini
- Genus: Tomoplagia
- Species: T. quinquefasciata

Binomial name
- Tomoplagia quinquefasciata (Macquart, 1835)

Synonyms
- Tephritis qninquefasciata Macquart, 1835

Species of fly

Tomoplagia quinquefasciata is a species of tephritid or fruit flies in the genus Tomoplagia of the family Tephritidae.

== Distribution ==
Paraguay.
