= Tetreuaresta heringi =

Scientific classification
- Kingdom: Animalia
- Phylum: Arthropoda
- Class: Insecta
- Order: Diptera
- Family: Tephritidae
- Subfamily: Tephritinae
- Tribe: Acrotaeniini
- Genus: Tetreuaresta
- Species: T. heringi

Binomial name
- Tetreuaresta heringi Norrbom, 1999

Synonyms
- Tetreuaresta rufula Hering, 1942

Species of fly

Tetreuaresta heringi is a species of tephritid or fruit flies in the genus Tetreuaresta of the family Tephritidae.

== Distribution ==
Colombia.
