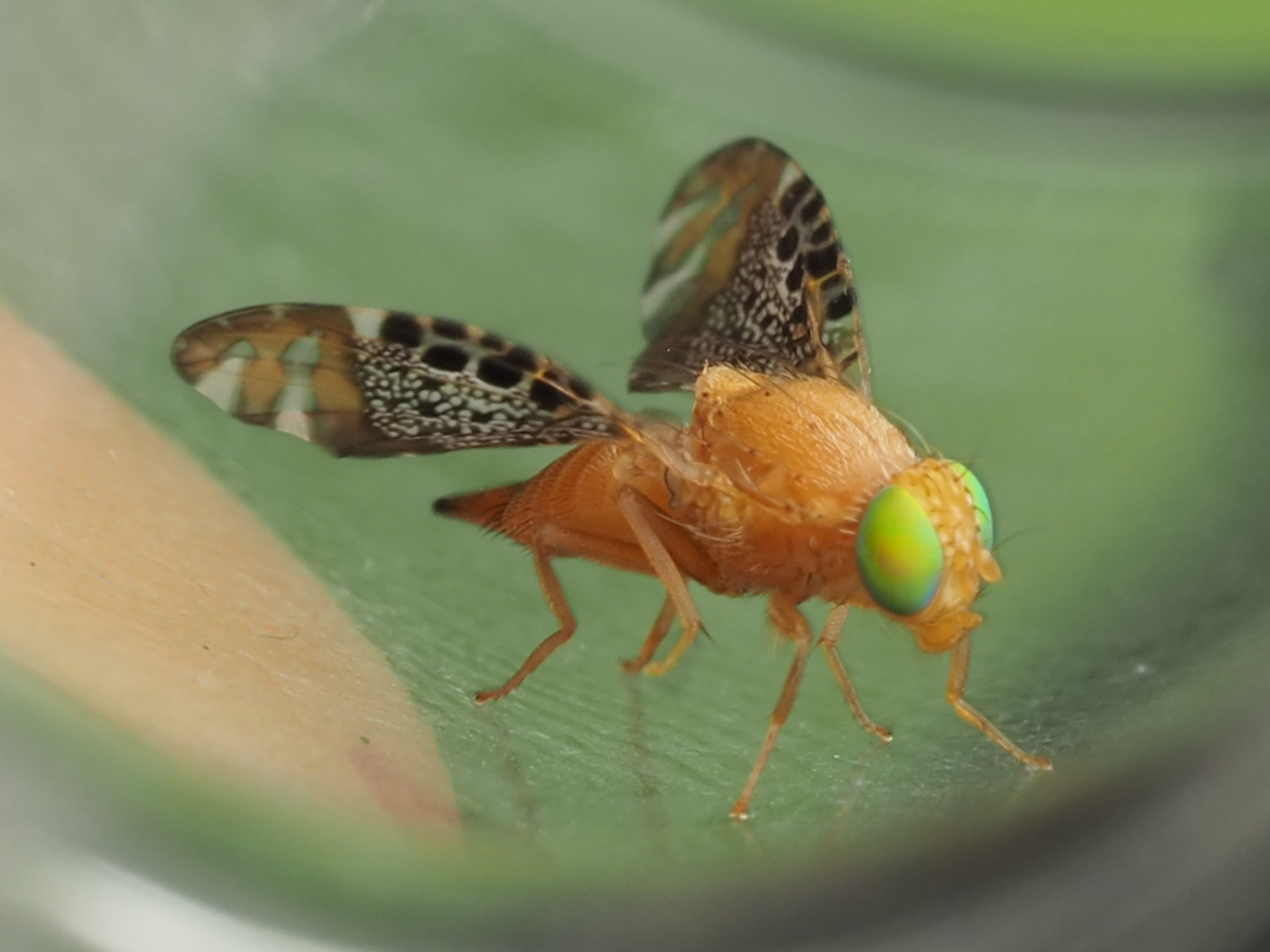

Scientific classification
- Kingdom: Animalia
- Phylum: Arthropoda
- Clade: Pancrustacea
- Class: Insecta
- Order: Diptera
- Family: Tephritidae
- Subfamily: Tephritinae
- Tribe: Acrotaeniini
- Genus: Acrotaenia; Loew, 1873

Type species
- Trypeta latipennis Wiedemann, 1873

= Acrotaenia =

Genus of flies

Acrotaenia is a genus of tephritid or fruit flies in the family Tephritidae.

== Species ==
- Acrotaenia latipennis (Wiedemann, 1830) — Brazil
- Acrotaenia otopappi Doane, 1899 — Mexico
- Acrotaenia spadix Bates, 1934 — Cuba, Haiti, Dominican Republic
- Acrotaenia tarsata Wulp, 1899 — Mexico, Belize
- Acrotaenia testudinea (Loew, 1873) — United States (Florida), Greater Antilles
- Acrotaenia trisignata Foote, 1960 — The Bahamas
