= Acrotaenia latipennis =

Scientific classification
- Kingdom: Animalia
- Phylum: Arthropoda
- Class: Insecta
- Order: Diptera
- Family: Tephritidae
- Subfamily: Tephritinae
- Tribe: Acrotaeniini
- Genus: Acrotaenia
- Species: A. latipennis

Binomial name
- Acrotaenia latipennis (Wiedemann, 1830)

Synonyms
- Trypeta latipennis Wiedemann, 1830; Trypeta argus Walker, 1849

Species of fly

Acrotaenia latipennis is a species of tephritid or fruit flies in the genus Acrotaenia of the family Tephritidae.

== Distribution ==
A. latipennis is found in Brazil.
