= Tetreuaresta phthonera =

Scientific classification
- Kingdom: Animalia
- Phylum: Arthropoda
- Class: Insecta
- Order: Diptera
- Family: Tephritidae
- Subfamily: Tephritinae
- Tribe: Acrotaeniini
- Genus: Tetreuaresta
- Species: T. phthonera

Binomial name
- Tetreuaresta phthonera (Hendel, 1914)

Synonyms
- Euaresta phthonera Hendel, 1914

Species of fly

Tetreuaresta phthonera is a species of tephritid or fruit flies in the genus Tetreuaresta of the family Tephritidae.

== Distribution ==
Peru.
