= Tomoplagia argentiniensis =

Scientific classification
- Kingdom: Animalia
- Phylum: Arthropoda
- Clade: Pancrustacea
- Class: Insecta
- Order: Diptera
- Family: Tephritidae
- Subfamily: Tephritinae
- Tribe: Acrotaeniini
- Genus: Tomoplagia
- Species: T. argentiniensis

Binomial name
- Tomoplagia argentiniensis Aczél, 1955

Synonyms
- Tomoplagia argentiniensis Aczél, 1955

Species of fly

Tomoplagia argentiniensis is a species of tephritid or fruit flies in the genus Tomoplagia of the family Tephritidae.

== Distribution ==
Brazil, Argentina.
