= Tetreuaresta guttata =

Scientific classification
- Kingdom: Animalia
- Phylum: Arthropoda
- Class: Insecta
- Order: Diptera
- Family: Tephritidae
- Subfamily: Tephritinae
- Tribe: Acrotaeniini
- Genus: Tetreuaresta
- Species: T. guttata

Binomial name
- Tetreuaresta guttata (Macquart, 1846)

Synonyms
- Acinia guttata Macquart, 1846

Species of fly

Tetreuaresta guttata is a species of tephritid or fruit flies in the genus Tetreuaresta of the family Tephritidae.

== Distribution ==
This species is found in Brazil.
