= Tetreuaresta spectabilis =

Scientific classification
- Kingdom: Animalia
- Phylum: Arthropoda
- Class: Insecta
- Order: Diptera
- Family: Tephritidae
- Subfamily: Tephritinae
- Tribe: Acrotaeniini
- Genus: Tetreuaresta
- Species: T. spectabilis

Binomial name
- Tetreuaresta spectabilis Loew, 1873

Synonyms
- Trypeta spectabilis Loew, 1873

Species of fly

Tetreuaresta spectabilis is a species of tephritid or fruit flies in the genus Tetreuaresta of the family Tephritidae.

== Distribution ==
Bolivia, Brazil Guyana.
