= Acrotaeniostola quadrifasciata =

Scientific classification
- Kingdom: Animalia
- Phylum: Arthropoda
- Clade: Pancrustacea
- Class: Insecta
- Order: Diptera
- Family: Tephritidae
- Subfamily: Tephritinae
- Tribe: Acrotaeniini
- Genus: Acrotaeniostola
- Species: A. quadrifasciata

Binomial name
- Acrotaeniostola quadrifasciata (Enderlein, 1911)

Synonyms
- Spilographa quadrifasciata Enderlein, 1911

Species of fly

Acrotaeniostola quadrifasciata is a species of tephritid or fruit flies in the genus Acrotaeniostola of the family Tephritidae.

== Distribution ==
Thailand, Laos, Vietnam, Malaysia, Indonesia.
