= Acrotaeniostola flavoscutellata =

Scientific classification
- Kingdom: Animalia
- Phylum: Arthropoda
- Class: Insecta
- Order: Diptera
- Family: Tephritidae
- Subfamily: Tephritinae
- Tribe: Acrotaeniini
- Genus: Acrotaeniostola
- Species: A. flavoscutellata

Binomial name
- Acrotaeniostola flavoscutellata Shiraki, 1933

Species of fly

Acrotaeniostola flavoscutellata is a species of tephritid or fruit flies in the genus Acrotaeniostola of the family Tephritidae.

== Distribution ==
Japan, Taiwan.
