= Tomoplagia incompleta =

Scientific classification
- Kingdom: Animalia
- Phylum: Arthropoda
- Clade: Pancrustacea
- Class: Insecta
- Order: Diptera
- Family: Tephritidae
- Subfamily: Tephritinae
- Tribe: Acrotaeniini
- Genus: Tomoplagia
- Species: T. incompleta

Binomial name
- Tomoplagia incompleta (Williston, 1896)

Synonyms
- Trypeta incompleta Williston, 1896

Species of fly

Tomoplagia incompleta is a species of tephritid or fruit flies in the genus Tomoplagia of the family Tephritidae.

== Distribution ==
West Indies, Paraguay, Brazil, Argentina.
