= Pseudopolionota =

Scientific classification
- Kingdom: Animalia
- Phylum: Arthropoda
- Class: Insecta
- Order: Diptera
- Family: Tephritidae
- Subfamily: Tephritinae
- Tribe: Acrotaeniini
- Genus: Pseudopolionota; Lima 1935

Type species
- Pseudopolionota radians Lima 1935

Genus of flies

Acrotaeniostola is a genus of tephritid or fruit flies in the family Tephritidae.

== Species ==
- Pseudopolionota radians Lima, 1935
