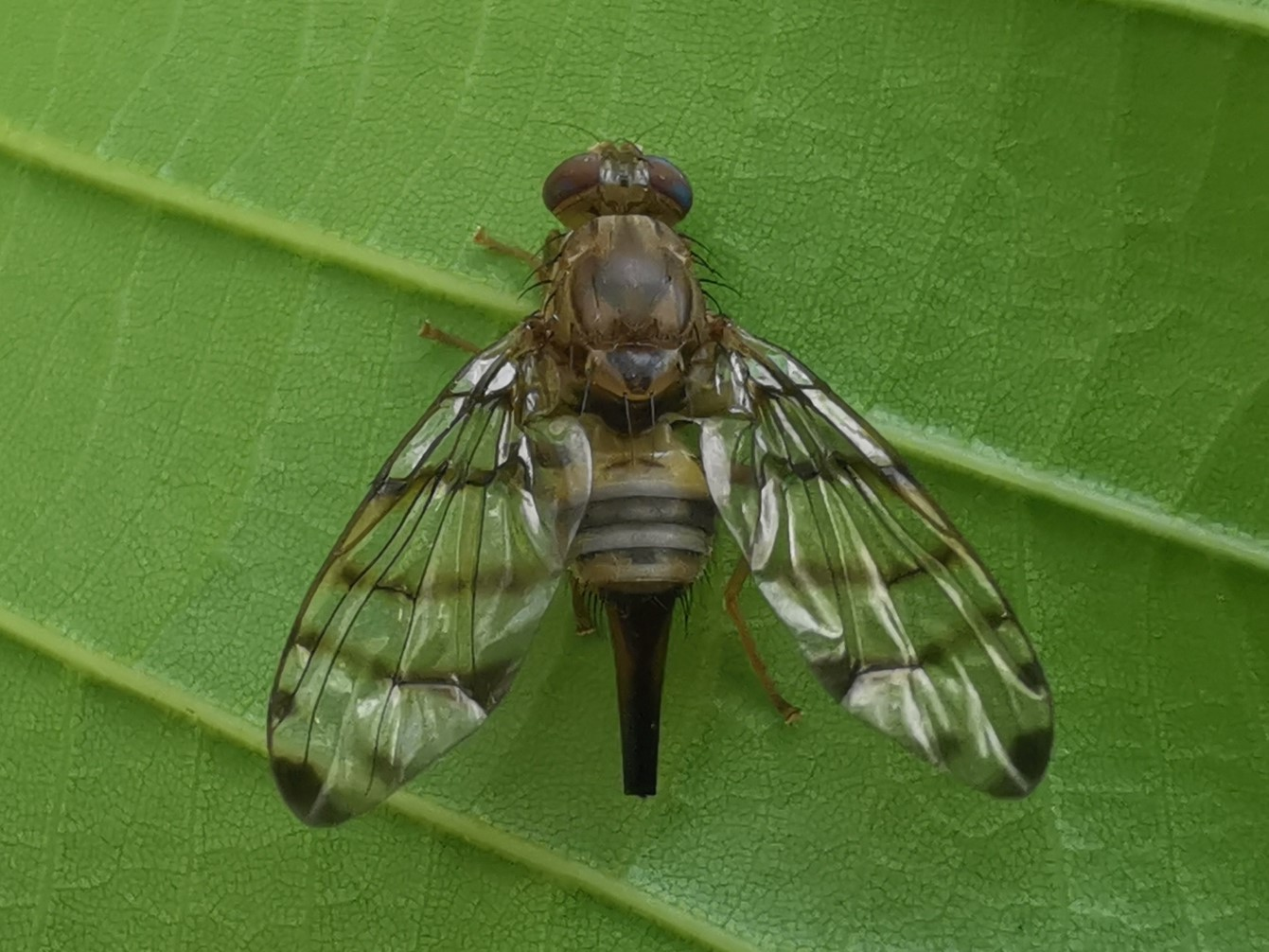
- Acrotaeniostola longicauda

Scientific classification
- Kingdom: Animalia
- Phylum: Arthropoda
- Class: Insecta
- Order: Diptera
- Family: Tephritidae
- Subfamily: Tephritinae
- Tribe: Acrotaeniini
- Genus: Acrotaeniostola; Hendel, 1914

Type species
- Acrotaeniostola sexvittata Hendel, 1914

= Acrotaeniostola =

Genus of flies

Acrotaeniostola is a genus of tephritid or fruit flies in the family Tephritidae.

== Species ==
- Acrotaeniostola apiventris Munro, 1935
- Acrotaeniostola dissimilis Zia, 1937
- Acrotaeniostola extorris Hering, 1942
- Acrotaeniostola flavoscutellata Shiraki, 1933
- Acrotaeniostola fuscinotum Hering, 1938
- Acrotaeniostola helvenaca Ito, 1984
- Acrotaeniostola hoenei Hering, 1936
- Acrotaeniostola interrupta Hardy, 1988
- Acrotaeniostola longicauda Wang, 1996
- Acrotaeniostola megispilota Hardy, 1974
- Acrotaeniostola pieli Zia, 1937
- Acrotaeniostola quadrifasciata (Enderlein, 1911)
- Acrotaeniostola quinaria (Coquillett, 1910)
- Acrotaeniostola sexvittata Hendel, 1914
- Acrotaeniostola spiralis Munro, 1935
- Acrotaeniostola yunnana Wang, 1996
