= Tomoplagia biseriata =

Scientific classification
- Kingdom: Animalia
- Phylum: Arthropoda
- Clade: Pancrustacea
- Class: Insecta
- Order: Diptera
- Family: Tephritidae
- Genus: Tomoplagia
- Species: T. biseriata

Binomial name
- Tomoplagia biseriata (Loew, 1873)

Species of fly

Tomoplagia biseriata is a species of tephritid or fruit flies in the genus Tomoplagia of the family Tephritidae.
