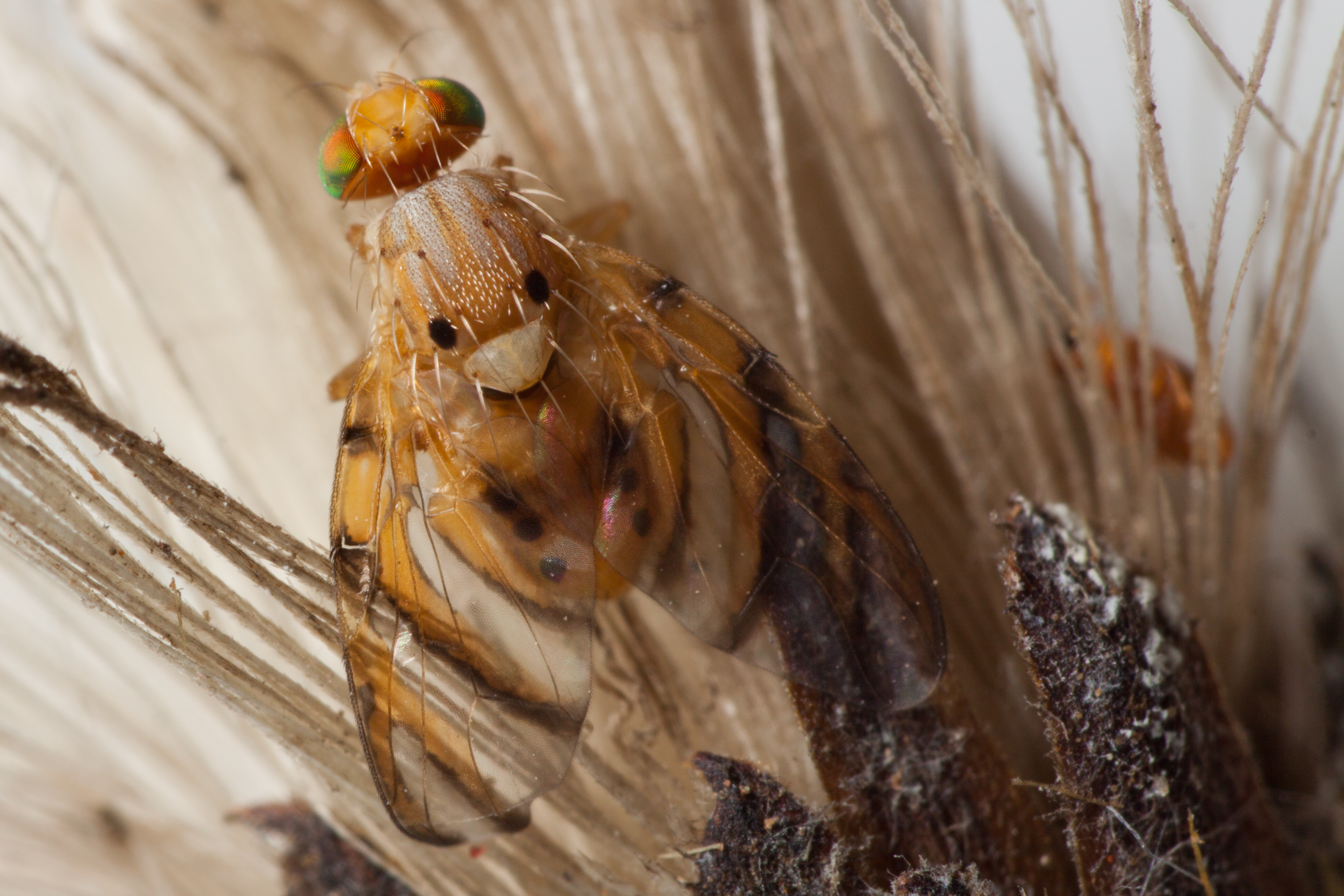
- Tomoplagia sp

Scientific classification
- Kingdom: Animalia
- Phylum: Arthropoda
- Class: Insecta
- Order: Diptera
- Family: Tephritidae
- Subfamily: Tephritinae
- Tribe: Acrotaeniini
- Genus: Tomoplagia; Coquillett, 1910

Type species
- Trypeta obliqua Say, 1830

Synonyms
- Plagiotoma Loew, 1873

= Tomoplagia =

Genus of flies

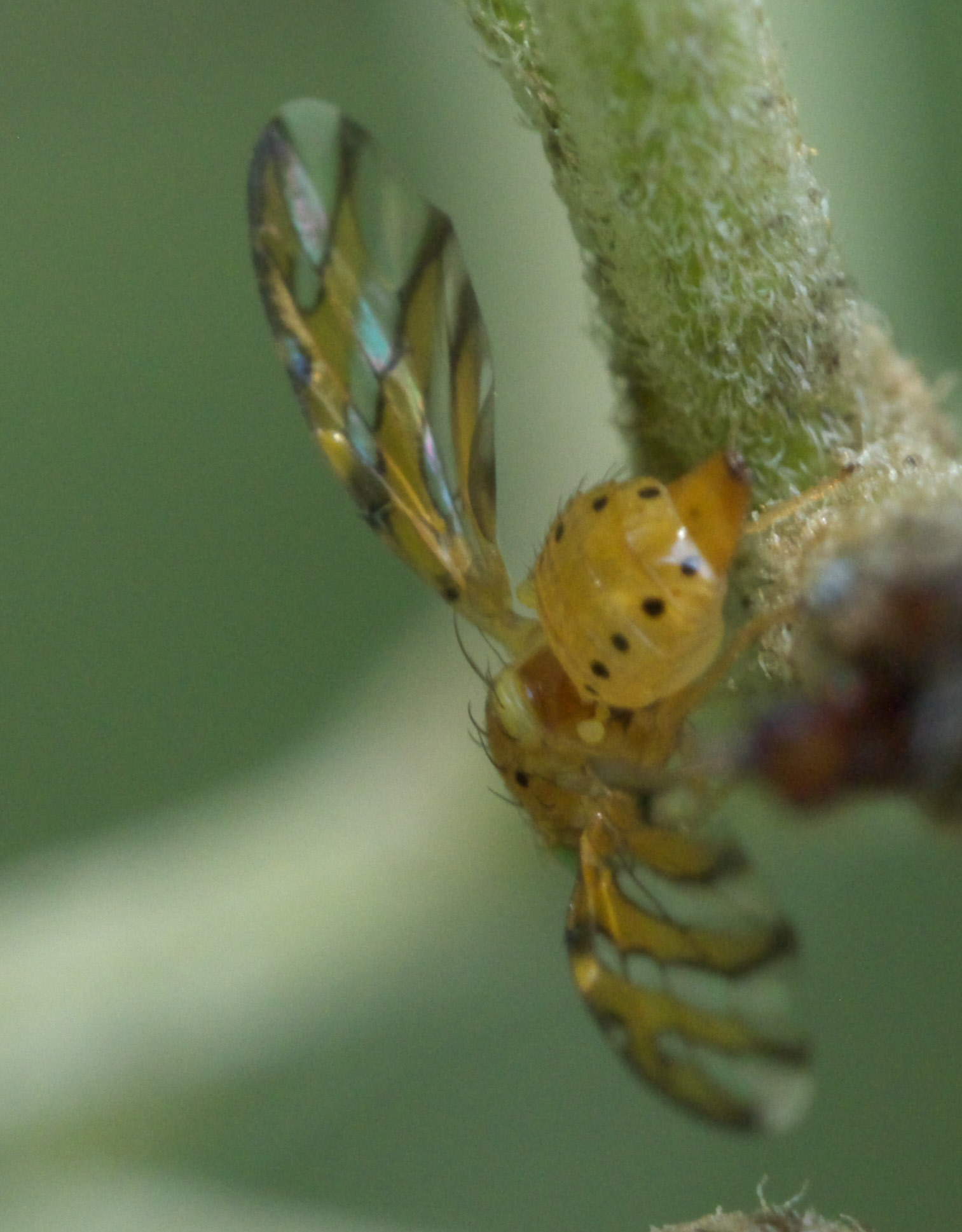

Tomoplagia is a genus of tephritid or fruit flies in the family Tephritidae.

== Species ==
- T. aberrans Aczél, 1954
- T. achromoptera Prado, Norrbom & Lewinsohn, 2004
- T. aczeli Prado, Norrbom & Lewinsohn, 2004
- T. argentiniensis Aczél, 1955
- T. arsinoe Hering, 1942
- T. atelesta Hendel, 1914
- T. atimeta Hendel, 1914
- T. bicolor Prado, Norrbom & Lewinsohn, 2004
- T. biseriata (Loew, 1873)
- T. brasiliensis Prado, Norrbom & Lewinsohn, 2004
- T. brevipalpis Aczél, 1955
- T. carrerai Aczél, 1955
- T. cipoensis Prado, Norrbom & Lewinsohn, 2004
- T. conjuncta Hendel, 1914
- T. costalimai Aczél, 1955
- T. cressoni Aczél, 1955
- T. deflorata Hering, 1937
- T. dejeanii (Robineau-Desvoidy, 1830)
- T. diagramma Hendel, 1914
- T. dimorphica Prado, Norrbom & Lewinsohn, 2004
- T. discolor (Loew, 1862)
- T. fiebrigi Hendel, 1914
- T. formosa Aczél, 1955
- T. grandis Prado, Norrbom & Lewinsohn, 2004
- T. heringi Aczél, 1955
- T. incompleta (Williston, 1896)
- T. interrupta Prado, Norrbom & Lewinsohn, 2004
- T. jonasi (Lutz & Lima, 1918)
- T. kelloggi Aczél, 1955
- T. matzenbacheri Prado, Norrbom & Lewinsohn, 2004
- T. minattai Aczél, 1955
- T. minuta Hering, 1938
- T. monostigma Hendel, 1914
- T. obliqua (Say, 1830)
- T. ovalipalpis Aczél, 1955
- T. pallens Abreu, Prado, Norrbom & Solfrerini, 2005
- T. penicillata Hendel, 1914
- T. phaedra Hendel, 1914
- T. pleuralis Hendel, 1914
- T. propleuralis Aczél, 1955
- T. pseudopenicillata Aczél, 1955
- T. punctata Aczél, 1955
- T. pura (Curran, 1931)
- T. quadriseriata Hendel, 1914
- T. quadrivittata Lima, 1934
- T. quinquefasciata (Macquart, 1835)
- T. reimoseri Hendel, 1914
- T. reticulata Abreu, Prado, Norrbom & Solfrerini, 2005
- T. rudolphi (Lutz & Lima, 1918)
- T. rupestris Prado, Norrbom & Lewinsohn, 2004
- T. salesopolitana Aczél, 1955
- T. separata Hendel, 1914
- T. stacta Hendel, 1914
- T. stonei Aczél, 1955
- T. titschacki Hering, 1941
- T. tripunctata Hendel, 1914
- T. trivittata (Lutz & Lima, 1918)
- T. unifascia Hendel, 1914
- T. variabilis Prado, Norrbom & Lewinsohn, 2004
- T. vernoniae Hering, 1938
- T. voluta Prado, Norrbom & Lewinsohn, 2004
