= Acrotaeniacantha =

Scientific classification
- Kingdom: Animalia
- Phylum: Arthropoda
- Class: Insecta
- Order: Diptera
- Family: Tephritidae
- Subfamily: Tephritinae
- Tribe: Acrotaeniini
- Genus: Acrotaeniacantha; Hendel, 1939

Type species
- Acrotaeniostola radiosa Hendel 1939

Genus of flies

Acrotaeniacantha is a genus of tephritid or fruit flies in the family Tephritidae.

== Species ==
- Acrotaeniacantha radiosa Hering, 1939
