= Tetrasarus lineatus =

Scientific classification
- Kingdom: Animalia
- Phylum: Arthropoda
- Class: Insecta
- Order: Coleoptera
- Suborder: Polyphaga
- Infraorder: Cucujiformia
- Family: Cerambycidae
- Genus: Tetrasarus
- Species: T. lineatus

Binomial name
- Tetrasarus lineatus Brèthes, 1920

Species of beetle

Tetrasarus lineatus is a species of beetle in the family Cerambycidae. It was described by Juan Brèthes in 1920.
