= Euarestopsis =

Scientific classification
- Kingdom: Animalia
- Phylum: Arthropoda
- Class: Insecta
- Order: Diptera
- Family: Tephritidae
- Subfamily: Tephritinae
- Tribe: Acrotaeniini
- Genus: Euarestopsis; Hering, 1937

Type species
- Euarestopsis paupera Hering, 1937

Genus of flies

Euarestopsis is a genus of tephritid or fruit flies in the family Tephritidae.

== Species ==
- Euarestopsis paupera Hering, 1937
