= Tetrasarus nanus =

Scientific classification
- Kingdom: Animalia
- Phylum: Arthropoda
- Class: Insecta
- Order: Coleoptera
- Suborder: Polyphaga
- Infraorder: Cucujiformia
- Family: Cerambycidae
- Genus: Tetrasarus
- Species: T. nanus

Binomial name
- Tetrasarus nanus Chemsak & Hovore, 2002

Species of beetle

Tetrasarus nanus is a species of beetle in the family Cerambycidae. It was described by Chemsak and Hovore in 2002.
