= Polionota =

Scientific classification
- Kingdom: Animalia
- Phylum: Arthropoda
- Class: Insecta
- Order: Diptera
- Family: Tephritidae
- Subfamily: Tephritinae
- Tribe: Acrotaeniini
- Genus: Polionota; Wulp, 1899

Type species
- Acrotoxa mucida Giglio-Tos, 1893

Synonyms
- Polyonota Aczél, 1950

Genus of flies

Polionota is a genus of tephritid or fruit flies in the family Tephritidae.

== Species ==
- Polionota beckeri Hering, 1953
- Polionota fantastica Norrbom, 1988
- Polionota kohnae Norrbom, 1988
- Polionota magnipennis Hendel, 1914
- Polionota mucida (Giglio-Tos, 1893)
- Polionota parva Norrbom, 1988
- Polionota radians Wulp, 1899
- Polionota reedae Norrbom, 1988
