= Marston Bates =

American zoologist (1906–1974)

- Born: July 23, 1906; Michigan
- Died: April 3, 1974 (aged 67)
- Education: University of Florida; Harvard University
- Known for: Mosquitoes; Yellow fever
- Scientific career
- Fields: Zoology; Epidemiology
- Workplaces: University of Michigan

Marston Bates (July 23, 1906 – April 3, 1974) was an American zoologist and environmental author. Bates' studies on mosquitoes contributed to the understanding of the epidemiology of yellow fever in northern South America.

== Biography ==
Born in Michigan, Bates received a BS in biology from the University of Florida in 1927. From 1928 to 1931, he worked as an entomologist for the United Fruit Company in Central America. He received a PhD in zoology in 1934 from Harvard University. He worked for the Rockefeller Foundation from 1935 to 1952, studying mosquito ecology, malaria, yellow fever, and human population. He lived for many years in Villavicencio between the mountains and the llanos in central Colombia. He served as special assistant to the president of the Rockefeller Foundation, 1950–1952. From 1952 until 1971 he was a professor at the University of Michigan. During that time, he also served as member of the National Research Council's expedition to the Ifalik Atoll in the South Pacific (1953), director of research at the University of Puerto Rico (1956-1957), and member of the Committee on Biological and Medical Sciences of the National Science Foundation (1952-1958). He was a Fellow of the Entomological Society of America in 1940 and an elected fellow of the American Academy of Arts and Sciences in 1958. He was the author of many popular science books. He was married to Nancy Bell Fairchild, daughter of the botanist David Fairchild and granddaughter of Alexander Graham Bell.

In 1960, he published the ecological science book The Forest and the Sea, an introduction to how ecosystems work. He compares a rain forest and a tropical sea, their similarities and differences, and through it demonstrates how to understand biological systems.

== Books ==
- Insectos Nocivos: Estudio de Las Principales Plagas Guatemaltecas (1932) Ciudad de Guatemala: Anuario del Servicio técnico de cooperación agrícola.
- “The Butterflies of Cuba.” (1935) Bulletin of the Museum of Comparative Zoology 78 (2): 65–258.
- The Natural History of Mosquitoes (1949) MacMillan; New York ASIN B001A8DVMU
- The Nature of Natural History (1950) Charles Scribner's Sons; New York; 309 pp. 2014 pbk reprint. Princeton University Press. 14 July 2014. ISBN 978-0-691-02446-2; with a new preface by Henry S. Horn
- Where Winter Never Comes: A Study of Man and Nature in the Tropics (1952) Charles Scribner's Sons; New York
- The Prevalence of People (1955) Charles Scribner's Sons; New York.
- Thomas Jr., William L., Carl O. Sauer, Marston Bates, and Lewis Mumford, eds. Man’s Role in Changing the Face of the Earth (1956) University of Chicago Press.
- Bates, Marston, and Philip S. Humphrey. Darwin Reader (1956) Scribner.
- Bates, Marston, and Donald Putnam Abbott. Coral Island: Portrait of an Atoll (1958) Scribner.
- Bates, Marston, and Donald Putnam Abbott. Ifaluk: Portrait of a Coral Island (1959) Museum Press.
- The Forest and the Sea: A Look at the Economy of Nature and the Ecology of Man. (1960) Random House (1988) Lyons
- Man in Nature (1961) Prentice-Hall.
- Bates, Marston, C. Haven Kolb, and the Biological Sciences Curriculum Study, American Institute of Biological Sciences. High School Biology: BSCS Green Version (1963) Rand McNally & Company.
- Animal Worlds (1963) Random House.
- The Land and Wildlife of South America (1964) part of the Life Nature Library series
- Gluttons and Libertines: Human Problems of Being Natural (1968) Random House
- A Jungle in the House: Essays in Natural and Unnatural History (1970) Walker and Company
