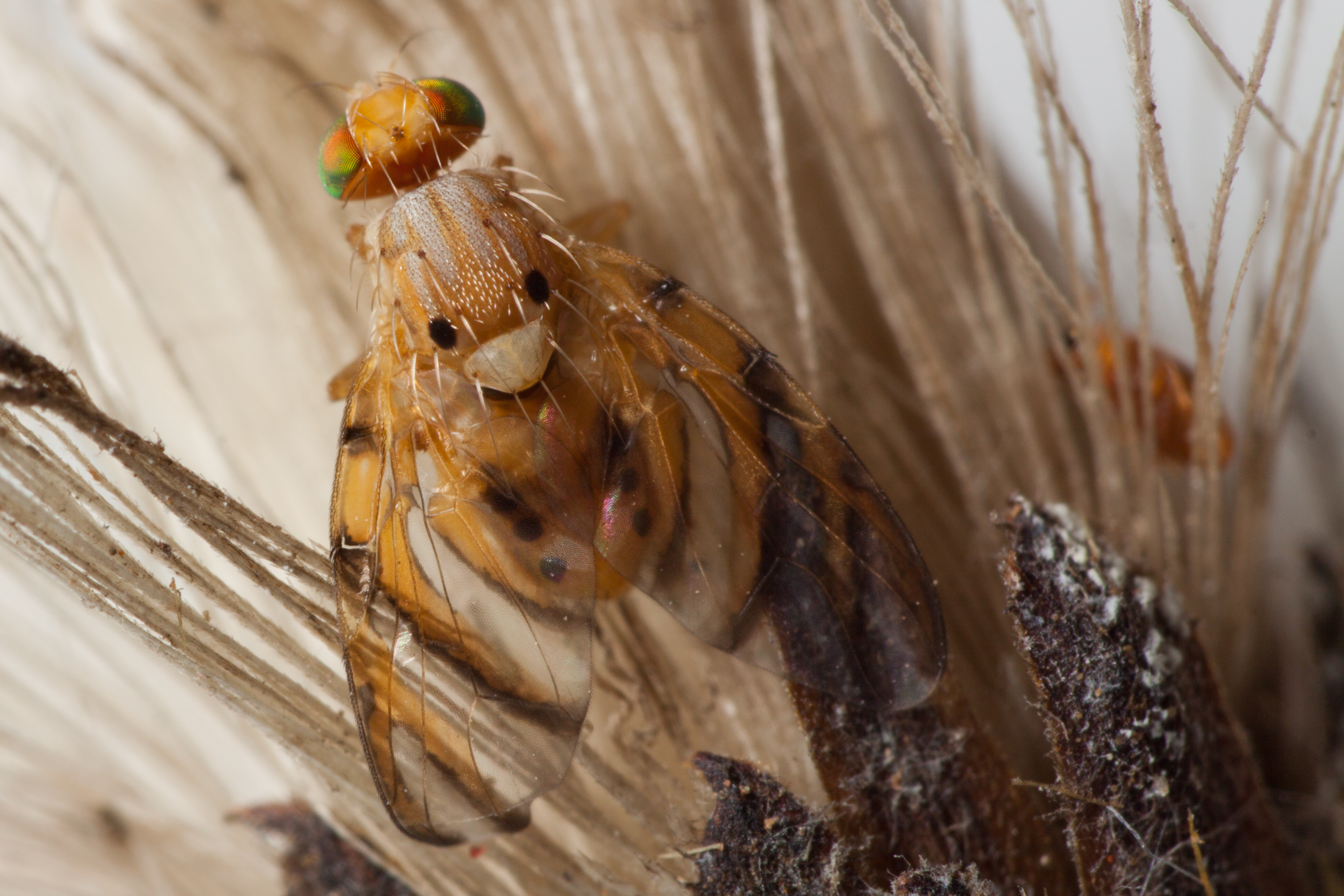

Scientific classification
- Kingdom: Animalia
- Phylum: Arthropoda
- Class: Insecta
- Order: Diptera
- Superfamily: Tephritoidea
- Family: Tephritidae
- Subfamily: Tephritinae
- Tribe: Acrotaeniini; Hendel, 1928

= Acrotaeniini =

Tribe of flies

Acrotaeniini is a tribe of tephritid or fruit flies in the family Tephritidae.

== Genera ==
- Acrotaenia Loew, 1873
- Acrotaeniacantha Hendel, 1939
- Acrotaeniostola Hendel, 1914
- Baryplegma Wulp, 1899
- Caenoriata Foote, 1978
- Euarestopsis Hering, 1937
- Neotaracia Foote, 1978
- Polionota Wulp, 1899
- Pseudopolionota Lima, 1935
- Tetreuaresta Hendel, 1928
- Tomoplagia Coquillett, 1910
