= Fregella =

Fregella may refer to:

- Fregella (genus), a genus of moths
- Fregellae, an ancient Italian city razed by the Romans after a revolt in 125 BC
