= Loxophlebia berberoi =

Scientific classification
- Domain: Eukaryota
- Kingdom: Animalia
- Phylum: Arthropoda
- Class: Insecta
- Order: Lepidoptera
- Superfamily: Noctuoidea
- Family: Erebidae
- Subfamily: Arctiinae
- Genus: Loxophlebia
- Species: L. berberoi

Binomial name
- Loxophlebia berberoi Jörgensen, 1935

Species of moth

Loxophlebia berberoi is a moth of the subfamily Arctiinae. It was described by Peter Jörgensen in 1935. It is found in Paraguay.
