= Odozana incarnata =

Scientific classification
- Domain: Eukaryota
- Kingdom: Animalia
- Phylum: Arthropoda
- Class: Insecta
- Order: Lepidoptera
- Superfamily: Noctuoidea
- Family: Erebidae
- Subfamily: Arctiinae
- Genus: Odozana
- Species: O. incarnata

Binomial name
- Odozana incarnata Jörgensen, 1935

Species of moth

Odozana incarnata is a moth of the subfamily Arctiinae. It was described by Peter Jörgensen in 1935 and it is found in Paraguay.
