= Eurata spegazzinii =

Scientific classification
- Domain: Eukaryota
- Kingdom: Animalia
- Phylum: Arthropoda
- Class: Insecta
- Order: Lepidoptera
- Superfamily: Noctuoidea
- Family: Erebidae
- Subfamily: Arctiinae
- Genus: Eurata
- Species: E. spegazzinii

Binomial name
- Eurata spegazzinii Jörgensen, 1913

Synonyms
- Eurota spegazzinii Jörgensen, 1913

Species of moth

Eurata spegazzinii is a moth of the subfamily Arctiinae. It was described by Peter Jörgensen in 1913 and it is found in Argentina.
