= Megachile albopunctata =

Scientific classification
- Domain: Eukaryota
- Kingdom: Animalia
- Phylum: Arthropoda
- Class: Insecta
- Order: Hymenoptera
- Family: Megachilidae
- Genus: Megachile
- Species: M. albopunctata

Binomial name
- Megachile albopunctata Jörgensen, 1909

Species of leafcutter bee (Megachile)

Megachile albopunctata is a species of bee in the family Megachilidae. It was described by Peter Jörgensen in 1909.
