= Eurata picta =

Scientific classification
- Domain: Eukaryota
- Kingdom: Animalia
- Phylum: Arthropoda
- Class: Insecta
- Order: Lepidoptera
- Superfamily: Noctuoidea
- Family: Erebidae
- Subfamily: Arctiinae
- Genus: Eurata
- Species: E. picta

Binomial name
- Eurata picta Herrich-Schäffer, 1853

Synonyms
- Glaucopis pictula Walker, 1854; Eurota obsoleta Draudt, 1931

Species of moth

Eurata picta is a moth of the subfamily Arctiinae. It was described by Gottlieb August Wilhelm Herrich-Schäffer in 1853. It is found in Venezuela.
