= Odozana sixola =

Scientific classification
- Domain: Eukaryota
- Kingdom: Animalia
- Phylum: Arthropoda
- Class: Insecta
- Order: Lepidoptera
- Superfamily: Noctuoidea
- Family: Erebidae
- Subfamily: Arctiinae
- Genus: Odozana
- Species: O. sixola

Binomial name
- Odozana sixola Schaus, 1911

Species of moth

Odozana sixola is a moth of the subfamily Arctiinae. It was described by William Schaus in 1911. It is found in Costa Rica and Panama.
