= Tessella klagesi =

Scientific classification
- Domain: Eukaryota
- Kingdom: Animalia
- Phylum: Arthropoda
- Class: Insecta
- Order: Lepidoptera
- Superfamily: Noctuoidea
- Family: Erebidae
- Subfamily: Arctiinae
- Genus: Tessella
- Species: T. klagesi

Binomial name
- Tessella klagesi (Rothschild, 1909)

Synonyms
- Carathis klagesi Rothschild, 1909

Species of moth

Tessella klagesi is a moth in the family Erebidae. It was described by Walter Rothschild in 1909. It is found in Brazil, French Guiana and Ecuador.
