= Loxophlebia triangulifera =

Scientific classification
- Domain: Eukaryota
- Kingdom: Animalia
- Phylum: Arthropoda
- Class: Insecta
- Order: Lepidoptera
- Superfamily: Noctuoidea
- Family: Erebidae
- Subfamily: Arctiinae
- Genus: Loxophlebia
- Species: L. triangulifera

Binomial name
- Loxophlebia triangulifera (Felder, 1874)

Synonyms
- Sphenoptera triangulifera Felder, 1874

Species of moth

Loxophlebia triangulifera is a moth of the subfamily Arctiinae. It was described by Baron Cajetan von Felder in 1874. It is found in Venezuela and the Amazon region.
