= Loxophlebia austeria =

Scientific classification
- Domain: Eukaryota
- Kingdom: Animalia
- Phylum: Arthropoda
- Class: Insecta
- Order: Lepidoptera
- Superfamily: Noctuoidea
- Family: Erebidae
- Subfamily: Arctiinae
- Genus: Loxophlebia
- Species: L. austeria

Binomial name
- Loxophlebia austeria Draudt, 1915

Species of moth

Loxophlebia austeria is a moth of the subfamily Arctiinae. It was described by Max Wilhelm Karl Draudt in 1915. It is found in Brazil.
