= Loxophlebia davisi =

Scientific classification
- Domain: Eukaryota
- Kingdom: Animalia
- Phylum: Arthropoda
- Class: Insecta
- Order: Lepidoptera
- Superfamily: Noctuoidea
- Family: Erebidae
- Subfamily: Arctiinae
- Genus: Loxophlebia
- Species: L. davisi

Binomial name
- Loxophlebia davisi Gibbs, 1913

Species of moth

Loxophlebia davisi is a moth of the subfamily Arctiinae. It was described by A. E. Gibbs in 1913. It is found in Honduras.
