= Odozana domina =

Scientific classification
- Domain: Eukaryota
- Kingdom: Animalia
- Phylum: Arthropoda
- Class: Insecta
- Order: Lepidoptera
- Superfamily: Noctuoidea
- Family: Erebidae
- Subfamily: Arctiinae
- Genus: Odozana
- Species: O. domina

Binomial name
- Odozana domina (Schaus, 1896)

Synonyms
- Talara domina Schaus, 1896

Species of moth

Odozana domina is a moth of the subfamily Arctiinae. It was described by Schaus in 1896. It is found in São Paulo, Brazil.
