= Hyperthaema sordida =

Scientific classification
- Domain: Eukaryota
- Kingdom: Animalia
- Phylum: Arthropoda
- Class: Insecta
- Order: Lepidoptera
- Superfamily: Noctuoidea
- Family: Erebidae
- Subfamily: Arctiinae
- Genus: Hyperthaema
- Species: H. sordida

Binomial name
- Hyperthaema sordida Rothschild, 1935

Species of moth

Hyperthaema sordida is a moth of the subfamily Arctiinae. It was described by Walter Rothschild in 1935. It is found in the Brazilian state of Santa Catarina.
