= Hyperthaema signatus =

Scientific classification
- Kingdom: Animalia
- Phylum: Arthropoda
- Class: Insecta
- Order: Lepidoptera
- Superfamily: Noctuoidea
- Family: Erebidae
- Subfamily: Arctiinae
- Genus: Hyperthaema
- Species: H. signatus

Binomial name
- Hyperthaema signatus (Walker, 1862)

Synonyms
- Elysius signatus Walker, 1862; Ammalo signata

Species of moth

Hyperthaema signatus is a moth of the subfamily Arctiinae. It was described by Francis Walker in 1862. It is found in Brazil.
