= Hyperthaema haemacta =

Scientific classification
- Domain: Eukaryota
- Kingdom: Animalia
- Phylum: Arthropoda
- Class: Insecta
- Order: Lepidoptera
- Superfamily: Noctuoidea
- Family: Erebidae
- Subfamily: Arctiinae
- Genus: Hyperthaema
- Species: H. haemacta

Binomial name
- Hyperthaema haemacta Schaus, 1901

Species of moth

Hyperthaema haemacta is a moth of the subfamily Arctiinae. It was described by Schaus in 1901. It is found in Costa Rica.
