= Eurata histrio =

Scientific classification
- Kingdom: Animalia
- Phylum: Arthropoda
- Clade: Pancrustacea
- Class: Insecta
- Order: Lepidoptera
- Superfamily: Noctuoidea
- Family: Erebidae
- Subfamily: Arctiinae
- Genus: Eurata
- Species: E. histrio

Binomial name
- Eurata histrio (Guérin-Méneville, 1843)

Synonyms
- Glaucopis histrio Guérin-Méneville, [1843]

Species of moth

Eurata histrio is a moth of the subfamily Arctiinae. It was described by Félix Édouard Guérin-Méneville in 1843. It is found in Bolivia, Paraguay and the Brazilian states of Rio de Janeiro and São Paulo.
