= Loxophlebia splendens =

Scientific classification
- Domain: Eukaryota
- Kingdom: Animalia
- Phylum: Arthropoda
- Class: Insecta
- Order: Lepidoptera
- Superfamily: Noctuoidea
- Family: Erebidae
- Subfamily: Arctiinae
- Genus: Loxophlebia
- Species: L. splendens

Binomial name
- Loxophlebia splendens (Möschler, 1872)

Synonyms
- Chrysostola splendens Möschler, 1872

Species of moth

Loxophlebia splendens is a moth of the subfamily Arctiinae. It was described by Heinrich Benno Möschler in 1872. It is found in French Guiana.
