= Loxophlebia asmodeus =

Scientific classification
- Domain: Eukaryota
- Kingdom: Animalia
- Phylum: Arthropoda
- Class: Insecta
- Order: Lepidoptera
- Superfamily: Noctuoidea
- Family: Erebidae
- Subfamily: Arctiinae
- Genus: Loxophlebia
- Species: L. asmodeus

Binomial name
- Loxophlebia asmodeus (H. Druce, 1883)

Synonyms
- Desmidocnemis asmodeus H. Druce, 1883

Species of moth

Loxophlebia asmodeus is a moth of the subfamily Arctiinae. It was described by Herbert Druce in 1883. It is found in Ecuador.
