= Eurata strigiventris =

Scientific classification
- Kingdom: Animalia
- Phylum: Arthropoda
- Clade: Pancrustacea
- Class: Insecta
- Order: Lepidoptera
- Superfamily: Noctuoidea
- Family: Erebidae
- Subfamily: Arctiinae
- Genus: Eurata
- Species: E. strigiventris

Binomial name
- Eurata strigiventris (Guérin-Méneville, 1830)

Synonyms
- Glaucopis strigiventris Guérin-Méneville, [1830]; Eurota dallasi Orfila, 1931; Eurota strigiventris famatina Orfila, 1931; Eurota harringtoni Orfila, 1931; Eurota strigiventris tucumana Orfila, 1931

Species of moth

Eurata strigiventris is a moth of the subfamily Arctiinae. It was described by Félix Édouard Guérin-Méneville in 1830. It is found in Brazil and Argentina.
