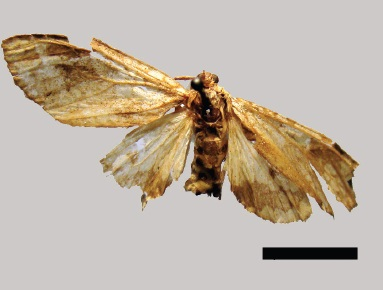

Scientific classification
- Domain: Eukaryota
- Kingdom: Animalia
- Phylum: Arthropoda
- Class: Insecta
- Order: Lepidoptera
- Superfamily: Noctuoidea
- Family: Erebidae
- Subfamily: Arctiinae
- Genus: Tessella
- Species: T. sertata

Binomial name
- Tessella sertata (Berg, 1882)

Synonyms
- Halysidota sertata Berg, 1882; Euerythra apiola Druce, 1899

= Tessella sertata =

Species of moth

Tessella sertata is a moth in the family Erebidae. It was described by Carlos Berg in 1882. It is found in Uruguay, Argentina and the Brazilian states of Espírito Santo, Santa Catarina and Rio Grande do Sul.
