= Loxophlebia masa =

Scientific classification
- Domain: Eukaryota
- Kingdom: Animalia
- Phylum: Arthropoda
- Class: Insecta
- Order: Lepidoptera
- Superfamily: Noctuoidea
- Family: Erebidae
- Subfamily: Arctiinae
- Genus: Loxophlebia
- Species: L. masa

Binomial name
- Loxophlebia masa (H. Druce, 1889)

Synonyms
- Laemocharis masa H. Druce, 1889

Species of moth

Loxophlebia masa is a moth of the subfamily Arctiinae. It was described by Herbert Druce in 1889. It is found in Mexico and Honduras.
