= Odozana floccosa =

Scientific classification
- Kingdom: Animalia
- Phylum: Arthropoda
- Class: Insecta
- Order: Lepidoptera
- Superfamily: Noctuoidea
- Family: Erebidae
- Subfamily: Arctiinae
- Genus: Odozana
- Species: O. floccosa

Binomial name
- Odozana floccosa Walker, 1864

Synonyms
- Hypocrita trichiura Felder, 1875; Odozana floccosa ab. ochreivitta Draudt, 1918; Odozana floccosa ab. reducta Draudt, 1918

Species of moth

Odozana floccosa is a moth of the subfamily Arctiinae. It was described by Francis Walker in 1864. It is found in Panama and Tefé, Brazil.
