= Eurata elegans =

Scientific classification
- Domain: Eukaryota
- Kingdom: Animalia
- Phylum: Arthropoda
- Class: Insecta
- Order: Lepidoptera
- Superfamily: Noctuoidea
- Family: Erebidae
- Subfamily: Arctiinae
- Genus: Eurata
- Species: E. elegans

Binomial name
- Eurata elegans H. Druce, 1906

Species of moth

Eurata elegans is a moth of the subfamily Arctiinae. It was described by Herbert Druce in 1906. It is found in Paraguay.
