= Eurata semiluna =

Scientific classification
- Kingdom: Animalia
- Phylum: Arthropoda
- Class: Insecta
- Order: Lepidoptera
- Superfamily: Noctuoidea
- Family: Erebidae
- Subfamily: Arctiinae
- Genus: Eurata
- Species: E. semiluna

Binomial name
- Eurata semiluna (Walker, 1854)

Synonyms
- Euchromia semiluna Walker, 1854

Species of moth

Eurata semiluna is a moth of the subfamily Arctiinae. It was described by Francis Walker in 1854. It is found in Brazil.
