= Odozana obscura =

Scientific classification
- Domain: Eukaryota
- Kingdom: Animalia
- Phylum: Arthropoda
- Class: Insecta
- Order: Lepidoptera
- Superfamily: Noctuoidea
- Family: Erebidae
- Subfamily: Arctiinae
- Genus: Odozana
- Species: O. obscura

Binomial name
- Odozana obscura (Schaus, 1896)

Synonyms
- Talara obscura Schaus, 1896

Species of moth

Odozana obscura is a moth of the subfamily Arctiinae. It was described by Schaus in 1896. It is found in Rio de Janeiro, Brazil.
