= Hyperthaema ruberrima =

Scientific classification
- Domain: Eukaryota
- Kingdom: Animalia
- Phylum: Arthropoda
- Class: Insecta
- Order: Lepidoptera
- Superfamily: Noctuoidea
- Family: Erebidae
- Subfamily: Arctiinae
- Genus: Hyperthaema
- Species: H. ruberrima

Binomial name
- Hyperthaema ruberrima Schaus, 1905

Species of moth

Hyperthaema ruberrima is a moth of the subfamily Arctiinae. It was described by William Schaus in 1905. It is found in French Guiana.
