= Loxophlebia postflavia =

Scientific classification
- Domain: Eukaryota
- Kingdom: Animalia
- Phylum: Arthropoda
- Class: Insecta
- Order: Lepidoptera
- Superfamily: Noctuoidea
- Family: Erebidae
- Subfamily: Arctiinae
- Genus: Loxophlebia
- Species: L. postflavia

Binomial name
- Loxophlebia postflavia H. Druce, 1898

Species of moth

Loxophlebia postflavia is a moth of the subfamily Arctiinae. It was described by Herbert Druce in 1898. It is found in French Guiana.
