= Eurata igniventris =

Scientific classification
- Kingdom: Animalia
- Phylum: Arthropoda
- Class: Insecta
- Order: Lepidoptera
- Superfamily: Noctuoidea
- Family: Erebidae
- Subfamily: Arctiinae
- Genus: Eurata
- Species: E. igniventris

Binomial name
- Eurata igniventris Burmeister, 1878

Synonyms
- Eurota breyeri Orfila, 1931

Species of moth

Eurata igniventris is a moth of the subfamily Arctiinae. It was described by Hermann Burmeister in 1878. It is found in Argentina.
