= Odozana cocciniceps =

Scientific classification
- Kingdom: Animalia
- Phylum: Arthropoda
- Clade: Pancrustacea
- Class: Insecta
- Order: Lepidoptera
- Superfamily: Noctuoidea
- Family: Erebidae
- Subfamily: Arctiinae
- Genus: Odozana
- Species: O. cocciniceps

Binomial name
- Odozana cocciniceps E. D. Jones, 1908

Species of moth

Odozana cocciniceps is a moth of the subfamily Arctiinae. It was described by E. Dukinfield Jones in 1908. It is found in Panama.

== Taxonomy and distribution ==
Odozana cocciniceps was originally described by E. Dukinfield Jones in his 1908 publication Descriptions of New Species of Lepidoptera-Heterocera from South-east Brazil, published in the Transactions of the Entomological Society of London. The type locality was recorded as Castro, in the Brazilian state of Paraná. The species was subsequently included in George Hampson's 1914 supplement to the Catalogue of the Lepidoptera Phalaenae in the British Museum, where it was listed on page 664 and illustrated in plate 35, figure 3.
