= Odozana margina =

Scientific classification
- Domain: Eukaryota
- Kingdom: Animalia
- Phylum: Arthropoda
- Class: Insecta
- Order: Lepidoptera
- Superfamily: Noctuoidea
- Family: Erebidae
- Subfamily: Arctiinae
- Genus: Odozana
- Species: O. margina

Binomial name
- Odozana margina Schaus, 1896

Synonyms
- Odozana margina ab. lutescens Draudt, 1918

Species of moth

Odozana margina is a moth of the subfamily Arctiinae. It was described by William Schaus in 1896. It is found in the Brazilian state of Paraná, Peru and Bolivia.
