= Loxophlebia roseipectus =

Scientific classification
- Domain: Eukaryota
- Kingdom: Animalia
- Phylum: Arthropoda
- Class: Insecta
- Order: Lepidoptera
- Superfamily: Noctuoidea
- Family: Erebidae
- Subfamily: Arctiinae
- Genus: Loxophlebia
- Species: L. roseipectus

Binomial name
- Loxophlebia roseipectus Rothschild, 1931

Species of moth

Loxophlebia roseipectus is a moth of the subfamily Arctiinae. It was described by Rothschild in 1931. It is found in Brazil.
