= Eurata hermione =

Scientific classification
- Domain: Eukaryota
- Kingdom: Animalia
- Phylum: Arthropoda
- Class: Insecta
- Order: Lepidoptera
- Superfamily: Noctuoidea
- Family: Erebidae
- Subfamily: Arctiinae
- Genus: Eurata
- Species: E. hermione

Binomial name
- Eurata hermione Berg, 1878

Synonyms
- Eurota polonia Orfila, 1931

Species of moth

Eurata hermione is a moth of the subfamily Arctiinae. It was described by Carlos Berg in 1878 and is found in Argentina.
