= Eurata vulcanus =

Scientific classification
- Kingdom: Animalia
- Phylum: Arthropoda
- Clade: Pancrustacea
- Class: Insecta
- Order: Lepidoptera
- Superfamily: Noctuoidea
- Family: Erebidae
- Subfamily: Arctiinae
- Genus: Eurata
- Species: E. vulcanus

Binomial name
- Eurata vulcanus (Walker, 1854)

Synonyms
- Euchromia vulcanus Walker, 1854; Endera vulcanus; Eurota descintes Dyar

Species of moth

Eurata vulcanus is a moth of the subfamily Arctiinae. It was described by Francis Walker in 1854. It is found in Mexico.
