= Loxophlebia tibba =

Scientific classification
- Domain: Eukaryota
- Kingdom: Animalia
- Phylum: Arthropoda
- Class: Insecta
- Order: Lepidoptera
- Superfamily: Noctuoidea
- Family: Erebidae
- Subfamily: Arctiinae
- Genus: Loxophlebia
- Species: L. tibba

Binomial name
- Loxophlebia tibba Schaus, 1924

Species of moth

Loxophlebia tibba is a moth of the subfamily Arctiinae. It was described by Schaus in 1924. It is found in Venezuela.
