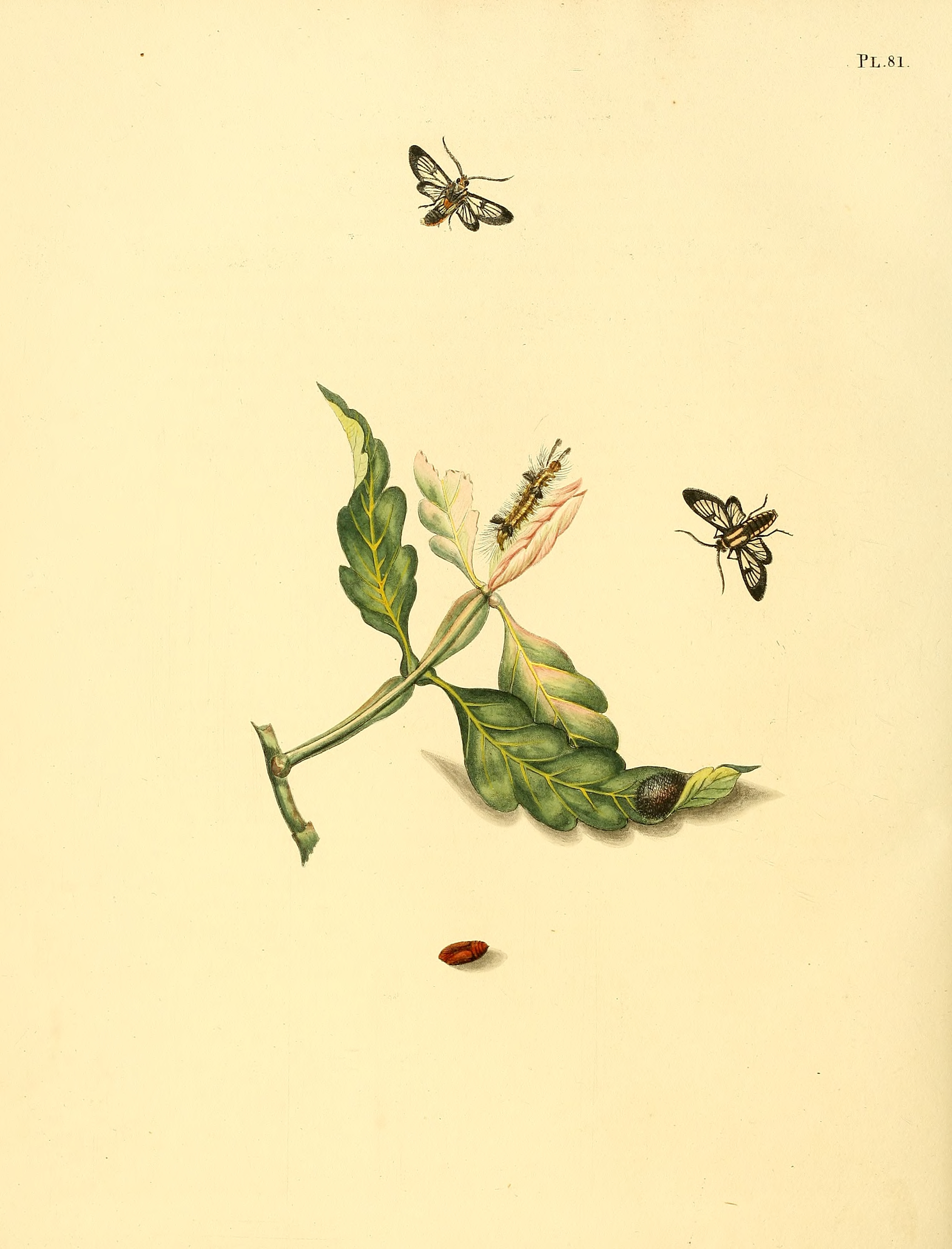

Scientific classification
- Domain: Eukaryota
- Kingdom: Animalia
- Phylum: Arthropoda
- Class: Insecta
- Order: Lepidoptera
- Superfamily: Noctuoidea
- Family: Erebidae
- Subfamily: Arctiinae
- Genus: Loxophlebia
- Species: L. diaphana

Binomial name
- Loxophlebia diaphana Sepp, 1848

Synonyms
- Glaucopis diaphana Sepp, [1848]; Glaucopis discifera Walker, 1854; Laemocharis bura Butler, 1877 (preocc. Herrich-Schäffer, 1854); Chrysostola albifrons Möschler, 1872

= Loxophlebia diaphana =

Species of moth

Loxophlebia diaphana is a moth of the subfamily Arctiinae. It was described by Sepp in 1848. It is found in the Amazon region.

The larvae have been recorded feeding on Serjania paullinia.

== See also ==
- Sepp publishing family
