= Eurata plutonica =

Scientific classification
- Kingdom: Animalia
- Phylum: Arthropoda
- Class: Insecta
- Order: Lepidoptera
- Superfamily: Noctuoidea
- Family: Erebidae
- Subfamily: Arctiinae
- Genus: Eurata
- Species: E. plutonica

Binomial name
- Eurata plutonica (Hampson, 1914)

Synonyms
- Eurota plutonica Hampson, 1914

Species of moth

Eurata plutonica is a moth of the subfamily Arctiinae. It was described by George Hampson in 1914. It is found in Mexico.
