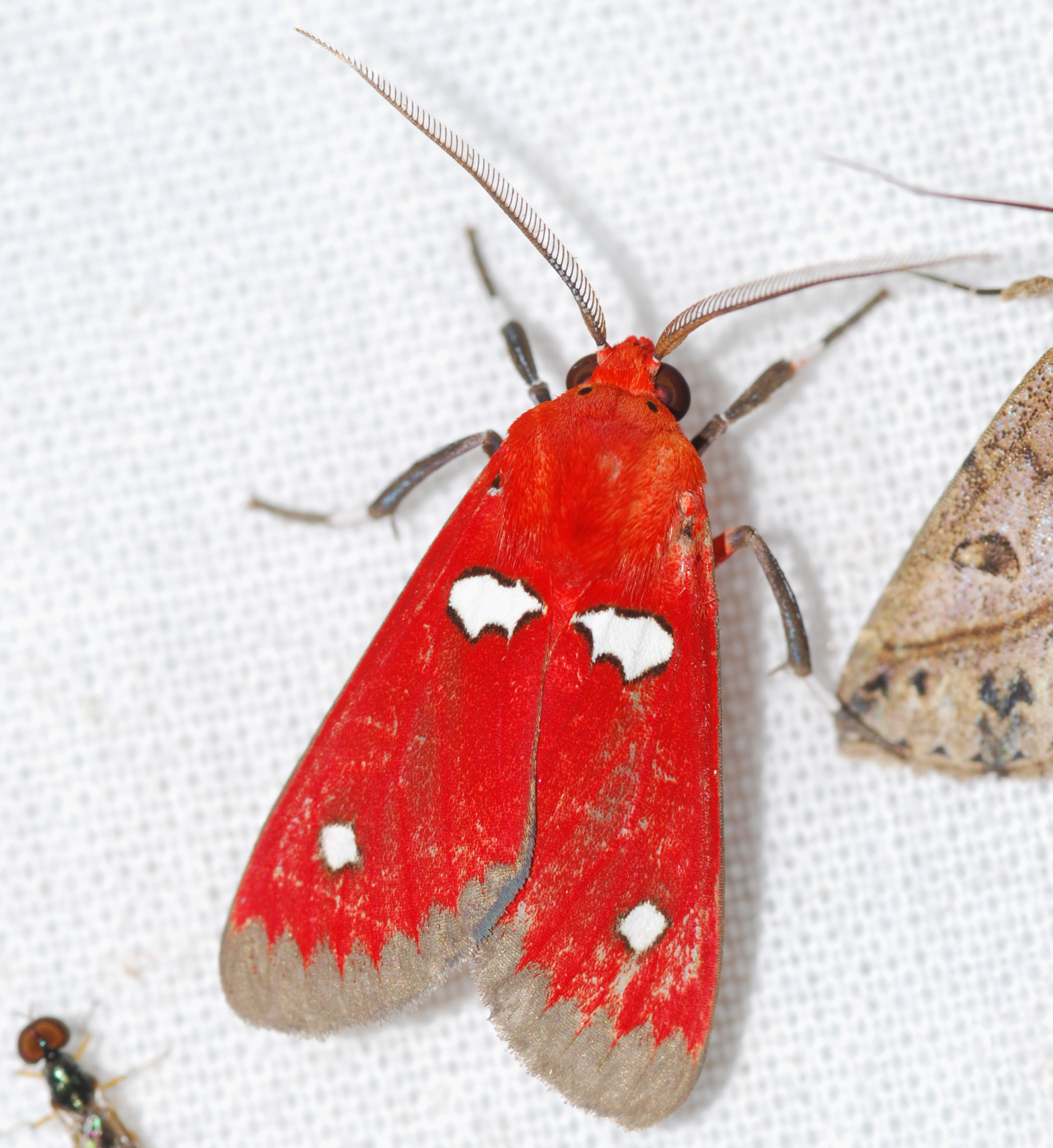

Scientific classification
- Domain: Eukaryota
- Kingdom: Animalia
- Phylum: Arthropoda
- Class: Insecta
- Order: Lepidoptera
- Superfamily: Noctuoidea
- Family: Erebidae
- Subfamily: Arctiinae
- Genus: Hyperthaema
- Species: H. hoffmannsi

Binomial name
- Hyperthaema hoffmannsi Rothschild, 1909

= Hyperthaema hoffmannsi =

Species of moth

Hyperthaema hoffmannsi is a moth of the subfamily Arctiinae. It was described by Rothschild in 1909. It is found in Brazil and French Guiana.
