= Loxophlebia geminata =

Scientific classification
- Domain: Eukaryota
- Kingdom: Animalia
- Phylum: Arthropoda
- Class: Insecta
- Order: Lepidoptera
- Superfamily: Noctuoidea
- Family: Erebidae
- Subfamily: Arctiinae
- Genus: Loxophlebia
- Species: L. geminata

Binomial name
- Loxophlebia geminata Schaus, 1905

Species of moth

Loxophlebia geminata is a moth of the subfamily Arctiinae. It was described by Schaus in 1905. It is found in French Guiana.
