= Eurata helena =

Scientific classification
- Domain: Eukaryota
- Kingdom: Animalia
- Phylum: Arthropoda
- Class: Insecta
- Order: Lepidoptera
- Superfamily: Noctuoidea
- Family: Erebidae
- Subfamily: Arctiinae
- Genus: Eurata
- Species: E. helena

Binomial name
- Eurata helena Herrich-Schäffer, 1854

Synonyms
- Laemocharis laetifica Maassen, 1890; Eurata helena ab. breyeri Orfila, 1931; Eurata helena ab. kohleri Orfila, 1931; Eurata helena f. nigricincta Hampson, 1907; Eurata helena ab. nosswitzi Orfila, 1931; Eurata xanthosoma Hampson, 1905; Eurota bolivae Strand, 1917; Eurata boliviana Draudt, 1915

Species of moth

Eurata helena is a moth of the subfamily Arctiinae. It was described by Gottlieb August Wilhelm Herrich-Schäffer in 1854. It is found in Argentina, Bolivia and Rio Grande do Sul, Brazil.
