= Loxophlebia chrysobasis =

Scientific classification
- Domain: Eukaryota
- Kingdom: Animalia
- Phylum: Arthropoda
- Class: Insecta
- Order: Lepidoptera
- Superfamily: Noctuoidea
- Family: Erebidae
- Subfamily: Arctiinae
- Genus: Loxophlebia
- Species: L. chrysobasis

Binomial name
- Loxophlebia chrysobasis Dognin, 1912

Species of moth

Loxophlebia chrysobasis is a moth of the subfamily Arctiinae. It was described by Paul Dognin in 1912. It is found in Colombia.
