= Eurata hilaris =

Scientific classification
- Domain: Eukaryota
- Kingdom: Animalia
- Phylum: Arthropoda
- Class: Insecta
- Order: Lepidoptera
- Superfamily: Noctuoidea
- Family: Erebidae
- Subfamily: Arctiinae
- Genus: Eurata
- Species: E. hilaris

Binomial name
- Eurata hilaris (Zerny, 1937)

Synonyms
- Eurota hilaris Zerny, 1937; Eurata herrichi Butler

Species of moth

Eurata hilaris is a moth of the subfamily Arctiinae. It was described by Hans Zerny in 1937.
