= Eurata tisamena =

Scientific classification
- Domain: Eukaryota
- Kingdom: Animalia
- Phylum: Arthropoda
- Class: Insecta
- Order: Lepidoptera
- Superfamily: Noctuoidea
- Family: Erebidae
- Subfamily: Arctiinae
- Genus: Eurata
- Species: E. tisamena

Binomial name
- Eurata tisamena Dognin, 1902

Species of moth

Eurata tisamena is a moth of the subfamily Arctiinae. It was described by Paul Dognin in 1902. It is found in São Paulo, Brazil.
