= Odozana =

Scientific classification
- Kingdom: Animalia
- Phylum: Arthropoda
- Class: Insecta
- Order: Lepidoptera
- Superfamily: Noctuoidea
- Family: Erebidae
- Subfamily: Arctiinae
- Tribe: Lithosiini
- Genus: Odozana; Walker, [1865]

Genus of moths

Odozana is a genus of moths in the subfamily Arctiinae.

== Species ==
- Odozana cocciniceps E. D. Jones, 1908
- Odozana decepta Schaus, 1911
- Odozana domina Schaus, 1896
- Odozana floccosa Walker, 1864
- Odozana incarnata Jörgensen, 1935
- Odozana inconspicua Schaus, 1911
- Odozana margina Schaus, 1896
- Odozana methaemata Hampson, 1900
- Odozana nigrata Reich, 1933
- Odozana obscura Schaus, 1896
- Odozana patagiata Dognin, 1909
- Odozana roseiceps Rothschild, 1913
- Odozana sixola Schaus, 1911
- Odozana unica Schaus, 1905
