= Eurata schausi =

Scientific classification
- Kingdom: Animalia
- Phylum: Arthropoda
- Class: Insecta
- Order: Lepidoptera
- Superfamily: Noctuoidea
- Family: Erebidae
- Subfamily: Arctiinae
- Genus: Eurata
- Species: E. schausi

Binomial name
- Eurata schausi (Hampson, 1898)

Synonyms
- Eurota schausi Hampson, 1898; Eurata halena Herrich-Schäffer, 1896

Species of moth

Eurata schausi is a moth of the subfamily Arctiinae. It was described by George Hampson in 1898. It is found in Paraná, Brazil.
