= Eurata maritana =

Scientific classification
- Domain: Eukaryota
- Kingdom: Animalia
- Phylum: Arthropoda
- Class: Insecta
- Order: Lepidoptera
- Superfamily: Noctuoidea
- Family: Erebidae
- Subfamily: Arctiinae
- Genus: Eurata
- Species: E. maritana

Binomial name
- Eurata maritana Schaus, 1896

Species of moth

Eurata maritana is a moth of the subfamily Arctiinae. It was described by William Schaus in 1896. It is found in Paraná, Brazil.
