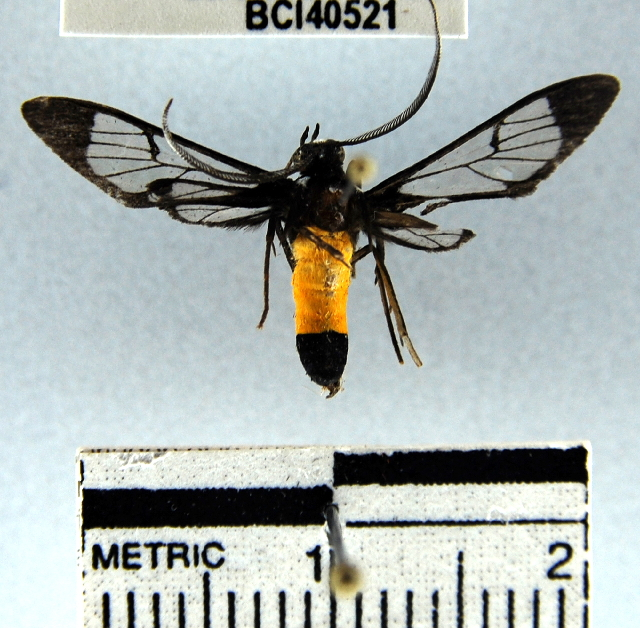
- Loxophlebia omalesia

Scientific classification
- Domain: Eukaryota
- Kingdom: Animalia
- Phylum: Arthropoda
- Class: Insecta
- Order: Lepidoptera
- Superfamily: Noctuoidea
- Family: Erebidae
- Subfamily: Arctiinae
- Tribe: Arctiini
- Subtribe: Euchromiina
- Genus: Loxophlebia; Butler, 1876

Synonyms
- Sphenoptera Felder, 1874 (preocc. Dejean, 1833); Asphenoptera Watson, 1980

= Loxophlebia =

Genus of moths

Loxophlebia is a genus of moths in the subfamily Arctiinae. The genus was erected by Arthur Gardiner Butler in 1876.

== Species ==
The genus includes the following species:

- Loxophlebia albicincta Dognin, 1907
- Loxophlebia asmodeoides Rothschild, 1931
- Loxophlebia asmodeus Druce, 1883
- Loxophlebia asseda Draudt, 1915
- Loxophlebia aurantiaca E. D. Jones, 1908
- Loxophlebia austeria Draudt, 1915
- Loxophlebia berberoi Jörgensen, 1935
- Loxophlebia braziliensis Rothschild, 1911
- Loxophlebia broteas Schaus, 1892
- Loxophlebia chrysobasis Dognin, 1912
- Loxophlebia cinctata Hampson, 1905
- Loxophlebia crocata Herrich-Schäffer, 1854
- Loxophlebia crusmatica Dognin, 1911
- Loxophlebia davisi Gibbs, 1913
- Loxophlebia diaphana Sepp, 1848
- Loxophlebia ducallis Jörgensen, 1935
- Loxophlebia egregia Schaus, 1911
- Loxophlebia eumonides Druce, 1883
- Loxophlebia fininigra Kaye, 1911
- Loxophlebia flavinigra E. D. Jones, 1908
- Loxophlebia flavipicta Schaus, 1912
- Loxophlebia geminata Schaus, 1905
- Loxophlebia imitata Druce, 1884
- Loxophlebia klagesi Rothschild, 1911
- Loxophlebia masa Druce, 1889
- Loxophlebia metamela Dognin, 1911
- Loxophlebia multicincta Dognin
- Loxophlebia nigricornis Rebel, 1901
- Loxophlebia omalesia Schaus, 1920
- Loxophlebia peralta Schaus, 1912
- Loxophlebia pheiodes Dognin, 1914
- Loxophlebia picta Walker, 1854
- Loxophlebia postflavia Druce, 1898
- Loxophlebia pyrgion Druce, 1884
- Loxophlebia roseipectus Rothschild, 1931
- Loxophlebia rubripicta Dognin, 1916
- Loxophlebia rufescens Rothschild, 1911
- Loxophlebia schrollei Jörgensen, 1935
- Loxophlebia semiaurantia Rothschild, 1931
- Loxophlebia senta Draudt, 1915
- Loxophlebia socorrensis Dognin, 1911
- Loxophlebia splendens Möschler, 1872
- Loxophlebia tibba Schaus, 1924
- Loxophlebia triangulifera Felder, 1869
- Loxophlebia vesparis Butler, 1873
