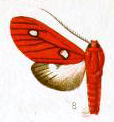

Scientific classification
- Kingdom: Animalia
- Phylum: Arthropoda
- Class: Insecta
- Order: Lepidoptera
- Superfamily: Noctuoidea
- Family: Erebidae
- Subfamily: Arctiinae
- Genus: Hyperthaema
- Species: H. perflammans

Binomial name
- Hyperthaema perflammans Hampson, 1916

= Hyperthaema perflammans =

Species of moth

Hyperthaema perflammans is a moth of the subfamily Arctiinae. It was described by George Hampson in 1916. It is found in Peru.
