= Eurata stictibasis =

Scientific classification
- Kingdom: Animalia
- Phylum: Arthropoda
- Clade: Pancrustacea
- Class: Insecta
- Order: Lepidoptera
- Superfamily: Noctuoidea
- Family: Erebidae
- Subfamily: Arctiinae
- Genus: Eurata
- Species: E. stictibasis

Binomial name
- Eurata stictibasis (Hampson, 1898)

Synonyms
- Eurota stictibasis Hampson, 1898

Species of moth

Eurata stictibasis is a moth of the subfamily Arctiinae. It was described by George Hampson in 1898. It is found in São Paulo, Brazil.
