= Loxophlebia peralta =

Scientific classification
- Domain: Eukaryota
- Kingdom: Animalia
- Phylum: Arthropoda
- Class: Insecta
- Order: Lepidoptera
- Superfamily: Noctuoidea
- Family: Erebidae
- Subfamily: Arctiinae
- Genus: Loxophlebia
- Species: L. peralta

Binomial name
- Loxophlebia peralta Schaus, 1912

Species of moth

Loxophlebia peralta is a moth of the subfamily Arctiinae. It was described by Schaus in 1912. It is found in Costa Rica.
