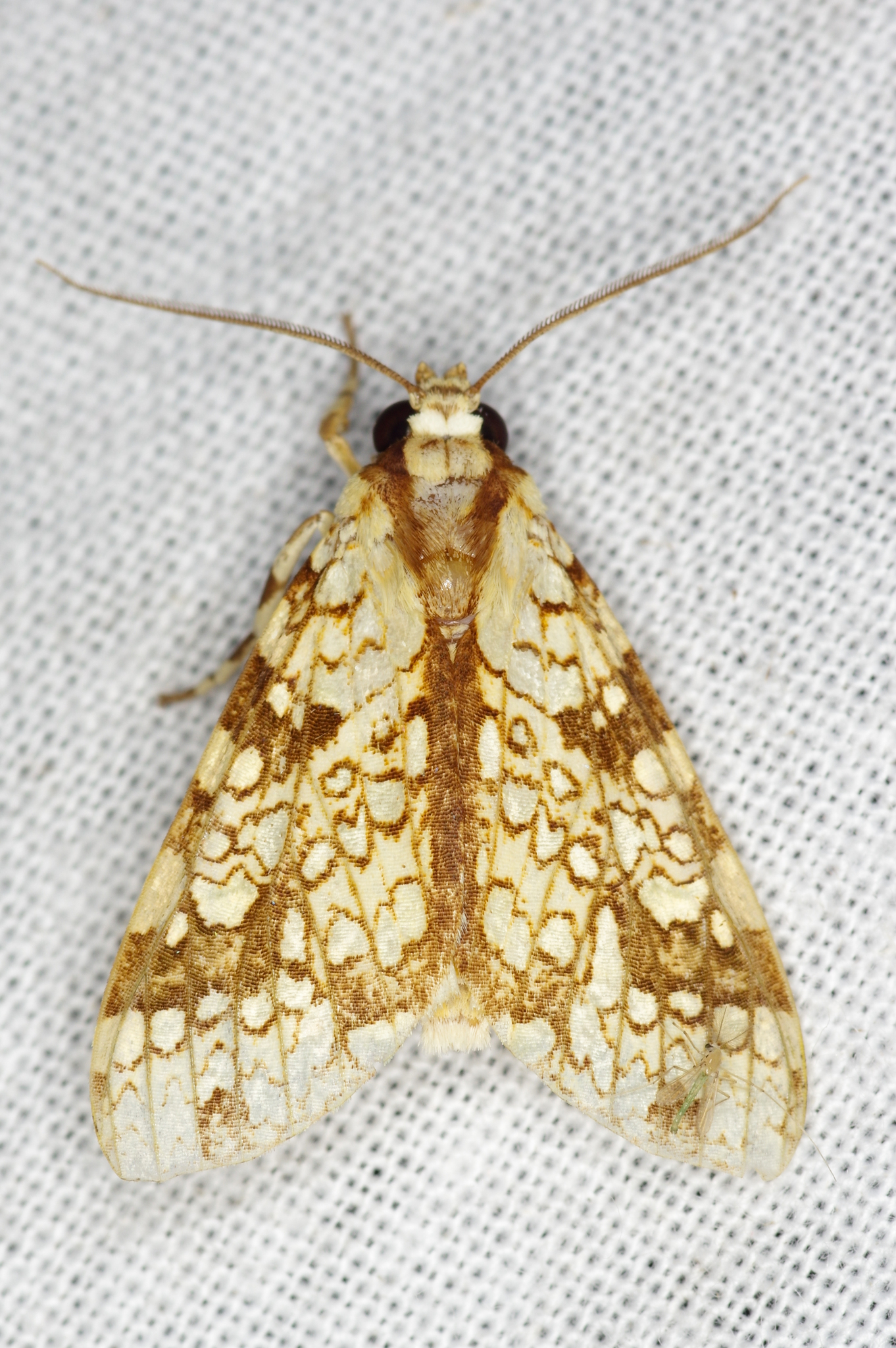

Scientific classification
- Domain: Eukaryota
- Kingdom: Animalia
- Phylum: Arthropoda
- Class: Insecta
- Order: Lepidoptera
- Superfamily: Noctuoidea
- Family: Erebidae
- Subfamily: Arctiinae
- Genus: Tessella
- Species: T. flavescens

Binomial name
- Tessella flavescens (Gaede, 1923)

Synonyms
- Ochrodota flavescens Gaede, 1923; Tessella grandis Toulgoët, 2002

= Tessella flavescens =

Species of moth

Tessella flavescens is a species of moth in the family Erebidae. It is found in French Guiana and Peru.

== Subspecies ==
- Tessella flavescens flavescens Gaede, 1923 - Peru
- Tessella flavescens guyanensis Toulgoët, 2002 - French Guiana
