= Anders Christian Jensen-Haarup =

Danish entomologist (1863–1934)

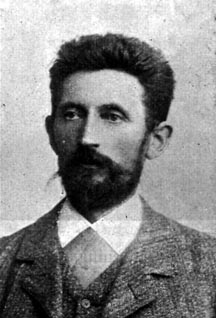
Anders Christian Jensen-Haarup

Anders Christian Jensen-Haarup (8 January 1863 – 30 January 1934) was a Danish entomologist who specialised in Hymenoptera. He was born in Nim and died in Silkeborg.

Jensen-Haarup was a teacher. In September 1904, he went to the province of Mendoza in Argentina on an insect collecting expedition. In 1905, he returned to Denmark to work on the material. In autumn of 1906 Jensen-Haarup went on a second trip to Argentina, this time accompanied by his friend Peter Jörgensen.

Jensen-Haarup published a series of popular accounts of the natural history of Argentina and wrote accounts of his travels as well as entomological works. The part of his collection which was not sold or retained by specialists to whom he sent material is in the Natural History Museum of Denmark, University of Copenhagen
