= Loxophlebia metamela =

Scientific classification
- Domain: Eukaryota
- Kingdom: Animalia
- Phylum: Arthropoda
- Class: Insecta
- Order: Lepidoptera
- Superfamily: Noctuoidea
- Family: Erebidae
- Subfamily: Arctiinae
- Genus: Loxophlebia
- Species: L. metamela

Binomial name
- Loxophlebia metamela Dognin, 1911

Species of moth

Loxophlebia metamela is a moth of the subfamily Arctiinae. It was described by Paul Dognin in 1911. It is found in South America.
