= Loxophlebia cinctata =

Scientific classification
- Kingdom: Animalia
- Phylum: Arthropoda
- Class: Insecta
- Order: Lepidoptera
- Superfamily: Noctuoidea
- Family: Erebidae
- Subfamily: Arctiinae
- Genus: Loxophlebia
- Species: L. cinctata

Binomial name
- Loxophlebia cinctata Hampson, 1905

Species of moth

Loxophlebia cinctata is a moth of the subfamily Arctiinae. It was described by George Hampson in 1905. It is found in Venezuela.
