= Loxophlebia flavinigra =

Scientific classification
- Domain: Eukaryota
- Kingdom: Animalia
- Phylum: Arthropoda
- Class: Insecta
- Order: Lepidoptera
- Superfamily: Noctuoidea
- Family: Erebidae
- Subfamily: Arctiinae
- Genus: Loxophlebia
- Species: L. flavinigra

Binomial name
- Loxophlebia flavinigra E. D. Jones, 1908

Species of moth

Loxophlebia flavinigra is a moth of the subfamily Arctiinae. It was described by E. Dukinfield Jones in 1908. It is found in Paraná, Brazil.
