= Hyperthaema cardinalis =

Scientific classification
- Domain: Eukaryota
- Kingdom: Animalia
- Phylum: Arthropoda
- Class: Insecta
- Order: Lepidoptera
- Superfamily: Noctuoidea
- Family: Erebidae
- Subfamily: Arctiinae
- Genus: Hyperthaema
- Species: H. cardinalis

Binomial name
- Hyperthaema cardinalis (Staudinger, 1875)

Synonyms
- Elysius cardinalis Staudinger, 1875

Species of moth

Hyperthaema cardinalis is a moth of the subfamily Arctiinae. It was described by Staudinger in 1875. It is found in Peru.
