= Loxophlebia crocata =

Scientific classification
- Domain: Eukaryota
- Kingdom: Animalia
- Phylum: Arthropoda
- Class: Insecta
- Order: Lepidoptera
- Superfamily: Noctuoidea
- Family: Erebidae
- Subfamily: Arctiinae
- Genus: Loxophlebia
- Species: L. crocata

Binomial name
- Loxophlebia crocata (Herrich-Schäffer, 1854)

Synonyms
- Laemocharis crocata Herrich-Schäffer, [1854]

Species of moth

Loxophlebia crocata is a moth of the subfamily Arctiinae. It was described by Gottlieb August Wilhelm Herrich-Schäffer in 1854. It is found in French Guiana and Rio de Janeiro, Brazil.
