= Odozana decepta =

Scientific classification
- Domain: Eukaryota
- Kingdom: Animalia
- Phylum: Arthropoda
- Class: Insecta
- Order: Lepidoptera
- Superfamily: Noctuoidea
- Family: Erebidae
- Subfamily: Arctiinae
- Genus: Odozana
- Species: O. decepta

Binomial name
- Odozana decepta Schaus, 1911

Species of moth

Odozana decepta is a moth of the subfamily Arctiinae. It was described by William Schaus in 1911. It is found in Costa Rica.
