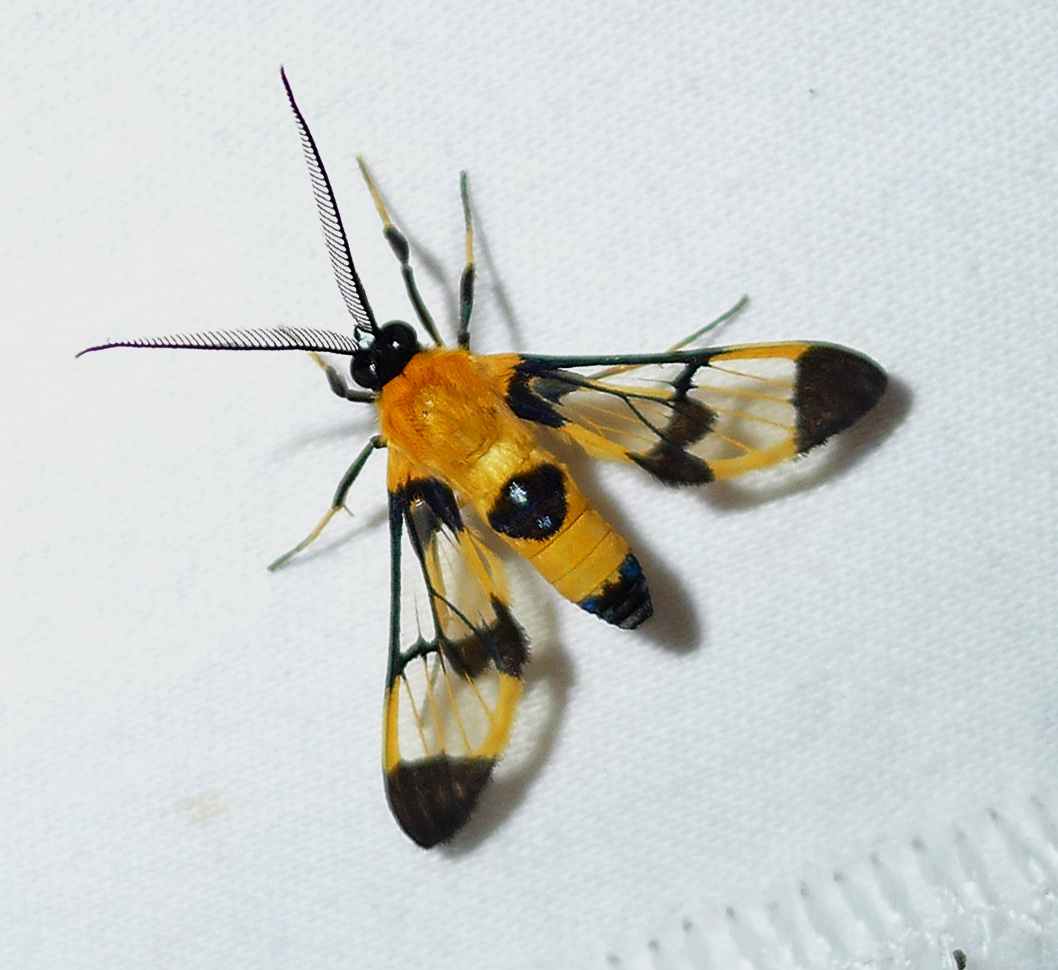

Scientific classification
- Domain: Eukaryota
- Kingdom: Animalia
- Phylum: Arthropoda
- Class: Insecta
- Order: Lepidoptera
- Superfamily: Noctuoidea
- Family: Erebidae
- Subfamily: Arctiinae
- Genus: Loxophlebia
- Species: L. flavipicta

Binomial name
- Loxophlebia flavipicta Schaus, 1912

= Loxophlebia flavipicta =

Species of moth

Loxophlebia flavipicta is a moth of the subfamily Arctiinae. It was described by Schaus in 1912. It is found in Costa Rica.
