= Eurata julia =

Scientific classification
- Domain: Eukaryota
- Kingdom: Animalia
- Phylum: Arthropoda
- Class: Insecta
- Order: Lepidoptera
- Superfamily: Noctuoidea
- Family: Erebidae
- Subfamily: Arctiinae
- Genus: Eurata
- Species: E. julia

Binomial name
- Eurata julia (Orfila, 1931)

Synonyms
- Eurota julia Orfila, 1931

Species of moth

Eurata julia is a moth of the subfamily Arctiinae. It was described by Orfila in 1931. It is found in Argentina.
