= Eurata jorgenseni =

Scientific classification
- Domain: Eukaryota
- Kingdom: Animalia
- Phylum: Arthropoda
- Class: Insecta
- Order: Lepidoptera
- Superfamily: Noctuoidea
- Family: Erebidae
- Subfamily: Arctiinae
- Genus: Eurata
- Species: E. jorgenseni

Binomial name
- Eurata jorgenseni (Orfila, 1931)

Synonyms
- Eurota jorgenseni Orfila, 1931; Eurota minuta Orfila, 1931; Eurata paraguayensis Schrott

Species of moth

Eurata jorgenseni is a moth of the subfamily Arctiinae. It was described by Orfila in 1931. It is found in Argentina.
