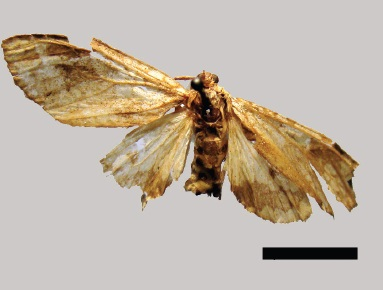
- Tessella sertata

Scientific classification
- Domain: Eukaryota
- Kingdom: Animalia
- Phylum: Arthropoda
- Class: Insecta
- Order: Lepidoptera
- Superfamily: Noctuoidea
- Family: Erebidae
- Subfamily: Arctiinae
- Subtribe: Phaegopterina
- Genus: Tessella; Breyer, 1957

= Tessella (moth) =

Genus of moths

Tessella is a genus of moths in the family Erebidae. The genus was described by Breyer in 1957.

== Species ==
- Tessella grandis Toulgoët, 2002
- Tessella jorgenseni Schaus, 1921
- Tessella klagesi (Rothschild, 1909)
- Tessella leucomelas Toulgoët, 2000
- Tessella sertata Berg, 1882

== Former species ==
- Tessella apostata Schaus, 1905
