= Loxophlebia rubripicta =

Scientific classification
- Domain: Eukaryota
- Kingdom: Animalia
- Phylum: Arthropoda
- Class: Insecta
- Order: Lepidoptera
- Superfamily: Noctuoidea
- Family: Erebidae
- Subfamily: Arctiinae
- Genus: Loxophlebia
- Species: L. rubripicta

Binomial name
- Loxophlebia rubripicta Dognin, 1916

Species of moth

Loxophlebia rubripicta is a moth of the subfamily Arctiinae. It was described by Paul Dognin in 1916. It is found in Brazil.
