= Loxophlebia broteas =

Scientific classification
- Domain: Eukaryota
- Kingdom: Animalia
- Phylum: Arthropoda
- Class: Insecta
- Order: Lepidoptera
- Superfamily: Noctuoidea
- Family: Erebidae
- Subfamily: Arctiinae
- Genus: Loxophlebia
- Species: L. broteas

Binomial name
- Loxophlebia broteas (Schaus, 1892)

Synonyms
- Dycladia broteas Schaus, 1892

Species of moth

Loxophlebia broteas is a moth of the subfamily Arctiinae. It was described by William Schaus in 1892. It is found in Santa Catarina, Brazil.
