= Eurata paraguayensis =

Scientific classification
- Domain: Eukaryota
- Kingdom: Animalia
- Phylum: Arthropoda
- Class: Insecta
- Order: Lepidoptera
- Superfamily: Noctuoidea
- Family: Erebidae
- Subfamily: Arctiinae
- Genus: Eurata
- Species: E. paraguayensis

Binomial name
- Eurata paraguayensis Schrottky, 1910

Synonyms
- Eurota cingulata Giacomelli, 1925

Species of moth

Eurata paraguayensis is a moth of the subfamily Arctiinae. It was described by Schrottky in 1910. It is found in Paraguay.
