= Loxophlebia pyrgion =

Scientific classification
- Domain: Eukaryota
- Kingdom: Animalia
- Phylum: Arthropoda
- Class: Insecta
- Order: Lepidoptera
- Superfamily: Noctuoidea
- Family: Erebidae
- Subfamily: Arctiinae
- Genus: Loxophlebia
- Species: L. pyrgion

Binomial name
- Loxophlebia pyrgion (H. Druce, 1884)

Synonyms
- Dycladia pyrgion H. Druce, 1884

Species of moth

Loxophlebia pyrgion is a moth of the subfamily Arctiinae. It was described by Herbert Druce in 1884. It is found in Panama and French Guiana.
