= Loxophlebia fininigra =

Scientific classification
- Domain: Eukaryota
- Kingdom: Animalia
- Phylum: Arthropoda
- Class: Insecta
- Order: Lepidoptera
- Superfamily: Noctuoidea
- Family: Erebidae
- Subfamily: Arctiinae
- Genus: Loxophlebia
- Species: L. fininigra

Binomial name
- Loxophlebia fininigra Kaye, 1911

Synonyms
- Loxophlebia fininigra f. dorsilineata Draudt, 1915

Species of moth

Loxophlebia fininigra is a moth of the subfamily Arctiinae. It was described by William James Kaye in 1911. It is found in Brazil.
