= Hyperthaema orbicularis =

Scientific classification
- Kingdom: Animalia
- Phylum: Arthropoda
- Class: Insecta
- Order: Lepidoptera
- Superfamily: Noctuoidea
- Family: Erebidae
- Subfamily: Arctiinae
- Genus: Hyperthaema
- Species: H. orbicularis

Binomial name
- Hyperthaema orbicularis (Maassen, 1890)

Synonyms
- Neritos orbicularis Maassen, 1890

Species of moth

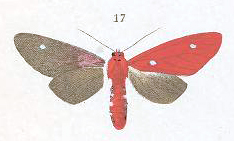
Hyperthaema orbicularis

Hyperthaema orbicularis is a moth of the subfamily Arctiinae. It was described by Peter Maassen in 1890. It is found in Colombia.
