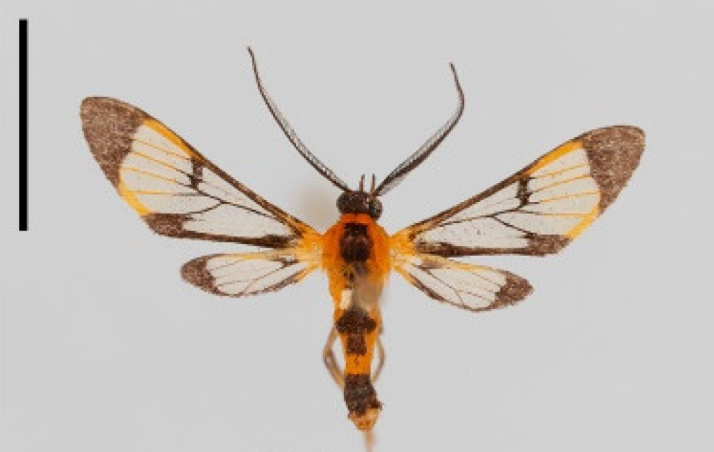

Scientific classification
- Kingdom: Animalia
- Phylum: Arthropoda
- Class: Insecta
- Order: Lepidoptera
- Superfamily: Noctuoidea
- Family: Erebidae
- Subfamily: Arctiinae
- Genus: Loxophlebia
- Species: L. picta

Binomial name
- Loxophlebia picta (Walker, 1854)

Synonyms
- Glaucopis picta Walker, 1854

= Loxophlebia picta =

Species of moth

Loxophlebia picta is a moth of the subfamily Arctiinae. It was described by Francis Walker in 1854. It is found in the Amazon region, with some more recent observations in Peru and Colombia.
