= Odozana unica =

Scientific classification
- Domain: Eukaryota
- Kingdom: Animalia
- Phylum: Arthropoda
- Class: Insecta
- Order: Lepidoptera
- Superfamily: Noctuoidea
- Family: Erebidae
- Subfamily: Arctiinae
- Genus: Odozana
- Species: O. unica

Binomial name
- Odozana unica Schaus, 1905

Species of moth

Odozana unica is a moth of the subfamily Arctiinae. It was described by William Schaus in 1905. It is found in Mexico.
