= Loxophlebia nigricornis =

Scientific classification
- Domain: Eukaryota
- Kingdom: Animalia
- Phylum: Arthropoda
- Class: Insecta
- Order: Lepidoptera
- Superfamily: Noctuoidea
- Family: Erebidae
- Subfamily: Arctiinae
- Genus: Loxophlebia
- Species: L. nigricornis

Binomial name
- Loxophlebia nigricornis Rebel, 1901

Species of moth

Loxophlebia nigricornis is a moth of the subfamily Arctiinae. It was described by Rebel in 1901. It is found in Colombia.
