= Odozana patagiata =

Scientific classification
- Domain: Eukaryota
- Kingdom: Animalia
- Phylum: Arthropoda
- Class: Insecta
- Order: Lepidoptera
- Superfamily: Noctuoidea
- Family: Erebidae
- Subfamily: Arctiinae
- Genus: Odozana
- Species: O. patagiata

Binomial name
- Odozana patagiata Dognin, 1909

Species of moth

Odozana patagiata is a moth of the subfamily Arctiinae. It was described by Paul Dognin in 1909. It is found in Bolivia.
