= Loxophlebia pheiodes =

Scientific classification
- Domain: Eukaryota
- Kingdom: Animalia
- Phylum: Arthropoda
- Class: Insecta
- Order: Lepidoptera
- Superfamily: Noctuoidea
- Family: Erebidae
- Subfamily: Arctiinae
- Genus: Loxophlebia
- Species: L. pheiodes

Binomial name
- Loxophlebia pheiodes Dognin, 1914

Synonyms
- Loxophlebia parea Draudt, 1915

Species of moth

Loxophlebia pheiodes is a moth of the subfamily Arctiinae. It was described by Paul Dognin in 1914. It is found in Colombia.
