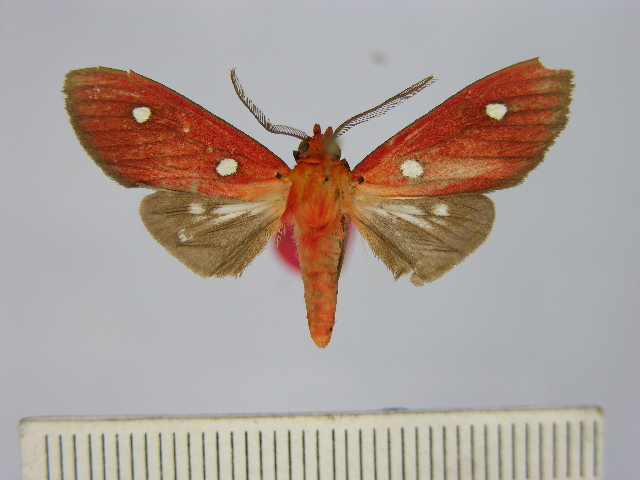

Scientific classification
- Kingdom: Animalia
- Phylum: Arthropoda
- Clade: Pancrustacea
- Class: Insecta
- Order: Lepidoptera
- Superfamily: Noctuoidea
- Family: Erebidae
- Subfamily: Arctiinae
- Genus: Hyperthaema
- Species: H. sanguineata

Binomial name
- Hyperthaema sanguineata (Walker, 1865)

Synonyms
- Halesidota sanguineata Walker, [1865]

= Hyperthaema sanguineata =

Species of moth

Hyperthaema sanguineata is a moth of the subfamily Arctiinae. It was described by Francis Walker in 1865. It is found in Colombia, Ecuador, Peru and Bolivia.
