= Eurata bifasciata =

Scientific classification
- Domain: Eukaryota
- Kingdom: Animalia
- Phylum: Arthropoda
- Class: Insecta
- Order: Lepidoptera
- Superfamily: Noctuoidea
- Family: Erebidae
- Subfamily: Arctiinae
- Genus: Eurata
- Species: E. bifasciata

Binomial name
- Eurata bifasciata Gaede, 1926

Synonyms
- Eurota bifasciata Gaede, 1926

Species of moth

Eurata bifasciata is a moth of the subfamily Arctiinae. It was described by Max Gaede in 1926. It is found on Cuba.
