= Loxophlebia vesparis =

Scientific classification
- Domain: Eukaryota
- Kingdom: Animalia
- Phylum: Arthropoda
- Class: Insecta
- Order: Lepidoptera
- Superfamily: Noctuoidea
- Family: Erebidae
- Subfamily: Arctiinae
- Genus: Loxophlebia
- Species: L. vesparis

Binomial name
- Loxophlebia vesparis (Butler, 1873)

Synonyms
- Poecilosoma vesparis Butler, 1873

Species of moth

Loxophlebia vesparis is a moth of the subfamily Arctiinae. It was described by Arthur Gardiner Butler in 1873. It is found in Peru and Bolivia.
