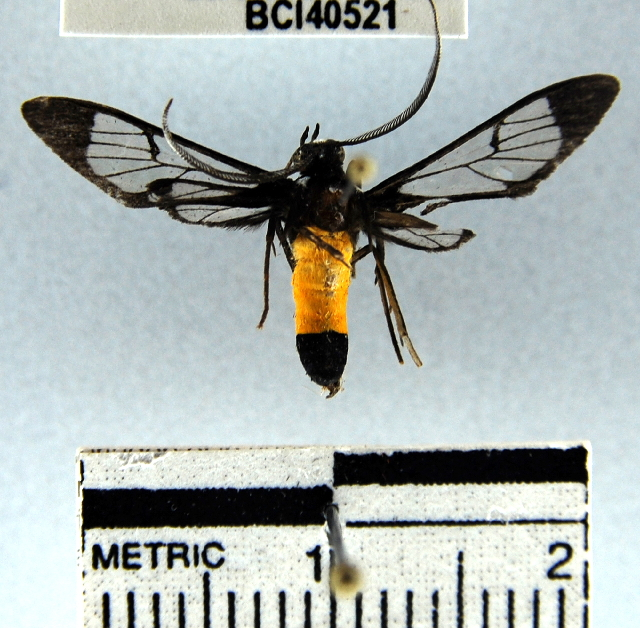

Scientific classification
- Kingdom: Animalia
- Phylum: Arthropoda
- Class: Insecta
- Order: Lepidoptera
- Superfamily: Noctuoidea
- Family: Erebidae
- Subfamily: Arctiinae
- Genus: Loxophlebia
- Species: L. omalesia

Binomial name
- Loxophlebia omalesia Schaus, 1920

= Loxophlebia omalesia =

Species of moth

Loxophlebia omalesia is a moth of the subfamily Arctiinae. It was described by Schaus in 1920. It is found in Guatemala and Belize
