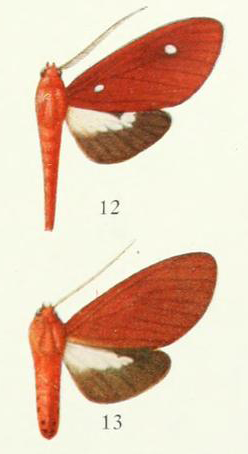
- Hyperthaema reducta

Scientific classification
- Kingdom: Animalia
- Phylum: Arthropoda
- Class: Insecta
- Order: Lepidoptera
- Superfamily: Noctuoidea
- Family: Erebidae
- Subfamily: Arctiinae
- Genus: Hyperthaema
- Species: H. reducta

Binomial name
- Hyperthaema reducta Joicey & Talbot, 1916

= Hyperthaema reducta =

Species of moth

Hyperthaema reducta is a moth of the subfamily Arctiinae. It was described by James John Joicey and George Talbot in 1916. It is found in Colombia.
