= Eurata sericaria =

Scientific classification
- Domain: Eukaryota
- Kingdom: Animalia
- Phylum: Arthropoda
- Class: Insecta
- Order: Lepidoptera
- Superfamily: Noctuoidea
- Family: Erebidae
- Subfamily: Arctiinae
- Genus: Eurata
- Species: E. sericaria

Binomial name
- Eurata sericaria (Perty, 1834)

Synonyms
- Glaucopis sericaria Perty, 1834; Eurota herrickii Butler, 1876; Eurota sericaria (Perty, 1834); Eurata herricki auctt. (misspelling)

Species of moth

Eurata sericaria is a moth of the subfamily Arctiinae. It was described by Perty in 1834. It is found in Minas Gerais, Brazil.
