= Odozana nigrata =

Scientific classification
- Domain: Eukaryota
- Kingdom: Animalia
- Phylum: Arthropoda
- Class: Insecta
- Order: Lepidoptera
- Superfamily: Noctuoidea
- Family: Erebidae
- Subfamily: Arctiinae
- Genus: Odozana
- Species: O. nigrata

Binomial name
- Odozana nigrata Reich, 1933

Species of moth

Odozana nigrata is a moth of the subfamily Arctiinae. It was described by Reich in 1933. It is found in Brazil.
