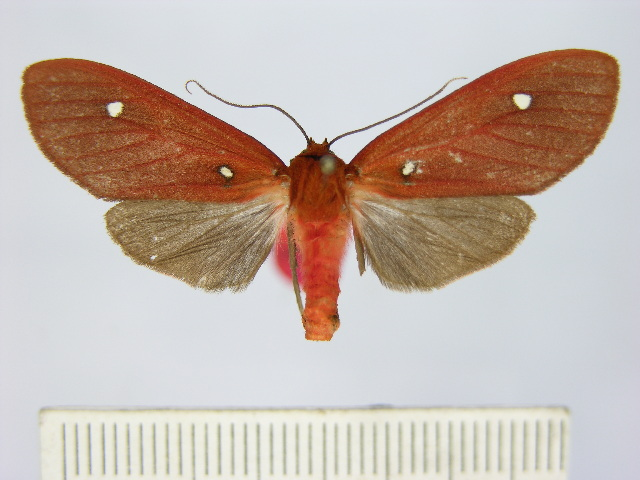

Scientific classification
- Domain: Eukaryota
- Kingdom: Animalia
- Phylum: Arthropoda
- Class: Insecta
- Order: Lepidoptera
- Superfamily: Noctuoidea
- Family: Erebidae
- Subfamily: Arctiinae
- Genus: Hyperthaema
- Species: H. sororita

Binomial name
- Hyperthaema sororita Schaus, 1920

= Hyperthaema sororita =

Species of moth

Hyperthaema sororita is a moth of the subfamily Arctiinae. It was described by Schaus in 1920. It is found in Guatemala.
