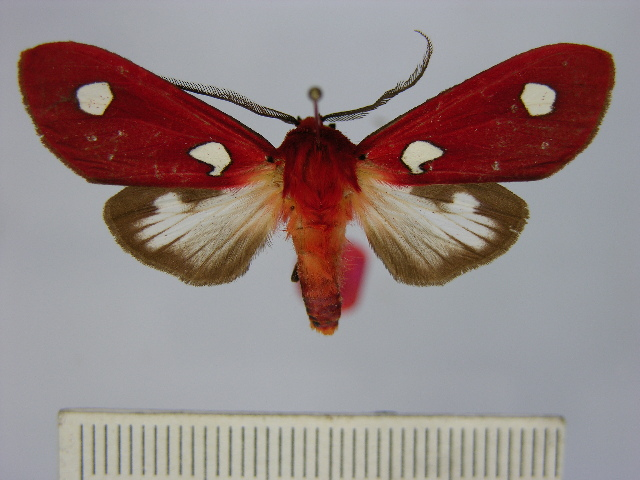
- Hyperthaema pulchra

Scientific classification
- Domain: Eukaryota
- Kingdom: Animalia
- Phylum: Arthropoda
- Class: Insecta
- Order: Lepidoptera
- Superfamily: Noctuoidea
- Family: Erebidae
- Subfamily: Arctiinae
- Subtribe: Phaegopterina
- Genus: Hyperthaema; Schaus, 1901

Synonyms
- Hyperthaema Hampson, 1901

= Hyperthaema =

Genus of moths

Hyperthaema is a genus of moths in the family Erebidae. The genus was described by William Schaus in 1901.

== Species ==
- Hyperthaema albipuncta Schaus, 1901
- Hyperthaema cardinalis Staudinger, 1875
- Hyperthaema caroei Jörgensen, 1935
- Hyperthaema coccinata Schaus, 1905
- Hyperthaema elysiusa Schaus, 1933
- Hyperthaema haemacta Schaus, 1901
- Hyperthaema hoffmannsi Rothschild, 1909
- Hyperthaema orbicularis Maassen, 1890
- Hyperthaema perflammans Hampson, 1916
- Hyperthaema pulchra Rothschild, 1935
- Hyperthaema punctata Rothschild, 1935
- Hyperthaema reducta Joicey & Talbot, 1916
- Hyperthaema ruberrima Schaus, 1905
- Hyperthaema sanguineata Walker, 1865
- Hyperthaema signatus Walker, 1862
- Hyperthaema sordida Rothschild, 1935
- Hyperthaema sororita Schaus, 1920
