= Loxophlebia imitata =

Scientific classification
- Domain: Eukaryota
- Kingdom: Animalia
- Phylum: Arthropoda
- Class: Insecta
- Order: Lepidoptera
- Superfamily: Noctuoidea
- Family: Erebidae
- Subfamily: Arctiinae
- Genus: Loxophlebia
- Species: L. imitata

Binomial name
- Loxophlebia imitata (H. Druce, 1884)

Synonyms
- Dycladia imitata H. Druce, 1884; Loxophlebia leucothema Dyar, 1914

Species of moth

Loxophlebia imitata is a moth of the subfamily Arctiinae. It was described by Herbert Druce in 1884. It is found in Guatemala, Panama and Venezuela.
