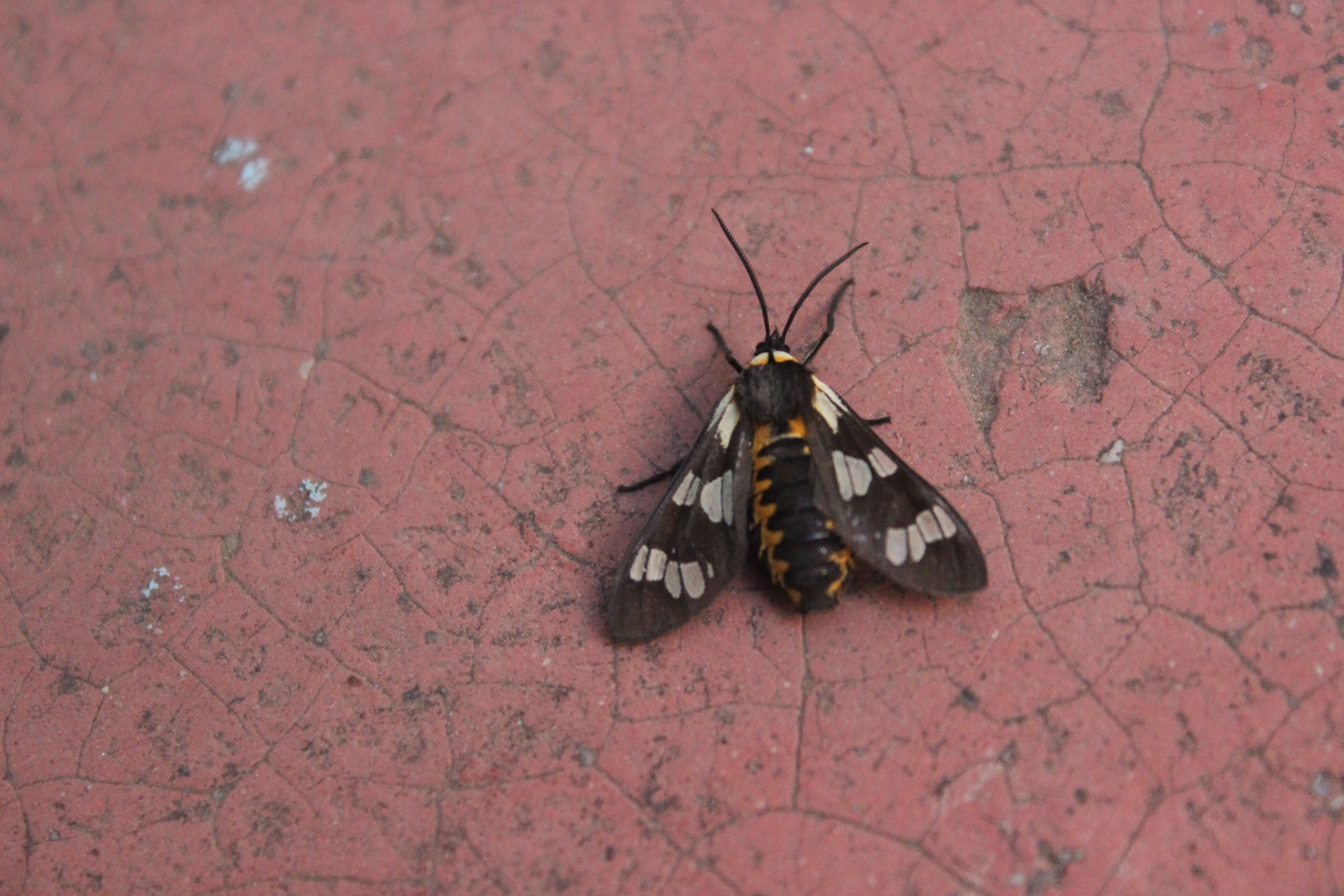

Scientific classification
- Domain: Eukaryota
- Kingdom: Animalia
- Phylum: Arthropoda
- Class: Insecta
- Order: Lepidoptera
- Superfamily: Noctuoidea
- Family: Erebidae
- Subfamily: Arctiinae
- Tribe: Arctiini
- Genus: Eurata; Herrich-Schäffer, [1853]

Synonyms
- Eurota Walker, 1854; Endera Walker, 1854; Fregella Walker, 1854

= Eurata =

Genus of moths

Eurata is a genus of moths in the subfamily Arctiinae. The genus was erected by Gottlieb August Wilhelm Herrich-Schäffer in 1853.

== Species ==
- Eurata baeri Rothschild, 1911
- Eurata bifasciata Gaede, 1926
- Eurata elegans Druce, 1906
- Eurata helena Herrich-Schäffer, 1854
- Eurata hermione Berg, 1878
- Eurata hilaris Zerny, 1937
- Eurata histrio Guérin-Meneville, 1843
- Eurata igniventris Berg, 1878
- Eurata jorgenseni Orfila, 1931
- Eurata julia Orfila, 1931
- Eurata maritana Schaus, 1896
- Eurata minerva Schaus, 1901
- Eurata paraguayensis Schrottky, 1910
- Eurata parishi Rothschild, 1911
- Eurata patagiata Burmeister, 1878
- Eurata picta Herrich-Schäffer, 1853
- Eurata plutonica Hampson, 1914
- Eurata schausi Hampson, 1898
- Eurata selva Herrich-Schäffer, 1854
- Eurata semiluna Walker, 1854
- Eurata sericaria Perty, 1834
- Eurata spegazzinii Jörgensen, 1913
- Eurata stictibasis Hampson, 1898
- Eurata strigiventris Guérin-Meneville, 1830
- Eurata tisamena Dognin, 1902
- Eurata vulcanus Walker, 1854
