= Tessella jorgenseni =

Scientific classification
- Domain: Eukaryota
- Kingdom: Animalia
- Phylum: Arthropoda
- Class: Insecta
- Order: Lepidoptera
- Superfamily: Noctuoidea
- Family: Erebidae
- Subfamily: Arctiinae
- Genus: Tessella
- Species: T. jorgenseni

Binomial name
- Tessella jorgenseni (Schaus, 1921)

Synonyms
- Tessellota jorgenseni Schaus, 1921

Species of moth

Tessella jorgenseni is a moth in the family Erebidae. It was described by William Schaus in 1921. It is found in Paraguay.
