= Peter Jörgensen =

Danish entomologist

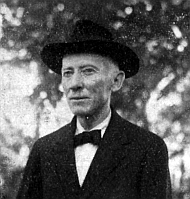
- Peter Jörgensen in Villarrica c. 1933
- Born: 3 August 1870; Sønderby, Denmark
- Died: 15 April 1937 (aged 66); Villarrica, Paraguay
- Occupation: Entomologist

Peter Jörgensen ("Pedro Jorgensen") (3 August 1870 in Sønderby, Funen – 15 April 1937 in Villarrica, Paraguay) was a Danish early 20th century entomologist, active particularly in Argentina and Paraguay.

== Life ==
Peter Jörgensen was educated as a teacher of English and German in Copenhagen in 1889. In 1892, he contracted tuberculosis — a condition he suffered from throughout the remainder of his life. In 1906, he joined his friend Anders Christian Jensen-Haarup on a trip to the Mendoza Province in western Argentina in the hope that the arid Andean climate would be beneficial to his health. The two naturalists made extensive insect collections, which were either sold (e.g. to the German entomologist Heinrich Friese) to cover their travel expenses or were sent to specialists for identification. They also published short accounts (in Danish) of their adventures in Argentina.

Jörgensen moved on to Paraguay, where he settled near Villarrica. He committed his life to a small farm and further entomological research. He also became a plant collector for several American museums. He was found murdered at his farm in April 1937.

== Bibliography ==
- Jørgensen, P. (1906): Beitrag zur Biologie der Blattwespen (Chalastogastra). Zeitschrift für wissenschaftliche Insektenbiologie, 2: 347–351.
- Jørgensen, P. (1906): De danske Arter af Bladhvepseslægten Pontania Costa (Chalastogastra). - Entomologiske Meddelelser, 3: 113–126.
- Jörgensen, P. (1909) Beobachtungen über Blumenbesuch, Biologie, Verbreitung usw. Der Bienen von Mendoza. (Hym.). Teil I. Deutsche Entomologische Zeitschrift, 1909, Heft 1: 53–65. Full text
- Jörgensen, P. (1909) Beobachtungen über Blumenbesuch, Biologie, Verbreitung usw. Der Bienen von Mendoza. (Hym.). Teil II. Deutsche Entomologische Zeitschrift, 1909, Heft 2: 211–227. Full text
- Kieffer, J.J. & Jörgensen, P. (1910) Gallen und Gallentiere aus Argentinien. Zentralblatt für Bakteriologie und Parasitenkunde (Abt. 2), 27: 362–444. Here, a new species was described as Centrodiplosis falcigera Jorgensen & Kieffer, which Kieffer subsequently moved to a newly erected genus Jorgensenia, named so in the honour of Peter Jörgensen.
- Jörgensen, P. (1912) Los crisídidos y los Himenópteros aculeatos de la Provincia de Mendoza. Anales del Museo Nacional de Buenos Aires, 22: 267–338. Full text
- Jörgensen, P. (1912) Beitrag zur Biologie einiger südamerikanischer Bienen, Anhang. Beschreibung von Megalopta (Megaloptella) ipomoeae n. sp. Zeitschrift für wissenschaftliche Insektenbiologie, 8: 268–272. Full text
- Jörgensen, P. (1912) Revision der Apiden der Provinz Mendoza, Republica Argentina (Hym.). Zoologisches Jahrbuch, Abteilung für Systematik, Geographie und Biologie der Tiere, 32: 89–162. Full text
- Jörgensen, P. (1912) Berichtigungen und Ergänzungen sur "Revision der Apiden der Provinz Mendoza, Republica Argentina (Hym.)". Zoologisches Jahrbuch, Abteilung für Systematik, Geographie und Biologie der Tiere, 33: 643–644.
- Jörgensen, P. (1913): Los Tenthredinoidea (Hym.) de la República Argentina. Anales del Museo Nacional de Historia Natural, Buenos Aires, 24: 247-288 + 3 plates.
- Jörgensen, P. (1916): Las mariposas Argentinas (Lepidoptera): familia Pieridae. Anales del Museo Nacional de Historia Natural, Buenos Aires, 28: 427–520.
- Jörgensen, P. (1921): Sobre algunos nuevos enemigos de la yerba maté, Ilex paraguariensis. Revista de la Sociedad Científica del Paraguay, Asunción, 2: 27–30.
- Jörgensen, P. (1924): Sobre dos casos de hermafroditismo en las mariposas (Lepidoptera). Revista de la Sociedad Científica del Paraguay, Asunción, 1 (6): 89–90.
- Jörgensen, P. (1924): Observaciones biológicas de Lepidópteros sudamericanos. Revista de la Sociedad Científica del Paraguay, Asunción, 1 (6): 84–89.
- Jörgensen, P. (1930): Los Castniidae de la Argentina y Paraguay. Revista de la Sociedad Entomológica Argentina, 3 (14): 175–180.
- Jörgensen, P. (1932): Lepidopterologisches aus Südamerika. Deutsche Entomologische Zeitschrift Iris, 46 (1): 37–66.
- Jörgensen, P. (1934): Neue Schmetterlinge und Raupen aus Südamerika. Deutsche Entomologische Zeitschrift Iris, 48: 60–78.
- Jörgensen, P. (1935): Lepidópteros nuevos o raros de la Argentina y del Paraguay. Anales del Museo Argentino de Ciencias Naturales Bernardino Rivadavia, Entomología, Buenos Aires, 38: 85-130 + 4 plates.

== Legacy ==
Jörgensen's extensive collection activity in understudied regions and his meticulous descriptions of specimens resulted in numerous new species being described by himself and by specialists around the world, with whom he corresponded. Heinrich Friese described 143 new taxa of Argentine bees collected in part by Jörgensen and Jensen-Haarup. Also the British-American zoologist Theodore Dru Alison Cockerell received specimens from Jörgensen and erected new species based on them. Today, a small fraction of his collections are kept in the Zoological Museum of the University of Copenhagen.

The monotypic ant lion genus Joergenia Esben-Petersen (1933) was named in his honour. Two gall midge genera are named for him: Jorgensenia Kieffer, 1913, and Jorgenseniella Maia, 2005 (Diptera: Cecidomyiidae). A number of insect species have similarly been named for him, e.g. Pontania joergenseni Enslin 1916 (Symphyta: Tenthredinidae), Tessella jorgenseni (Schaus, 1921) (Lepidoptera: Arctiidae) and Eurota joergenseni Orfila, 1931 (Lepidoptera: Arctiidae).
