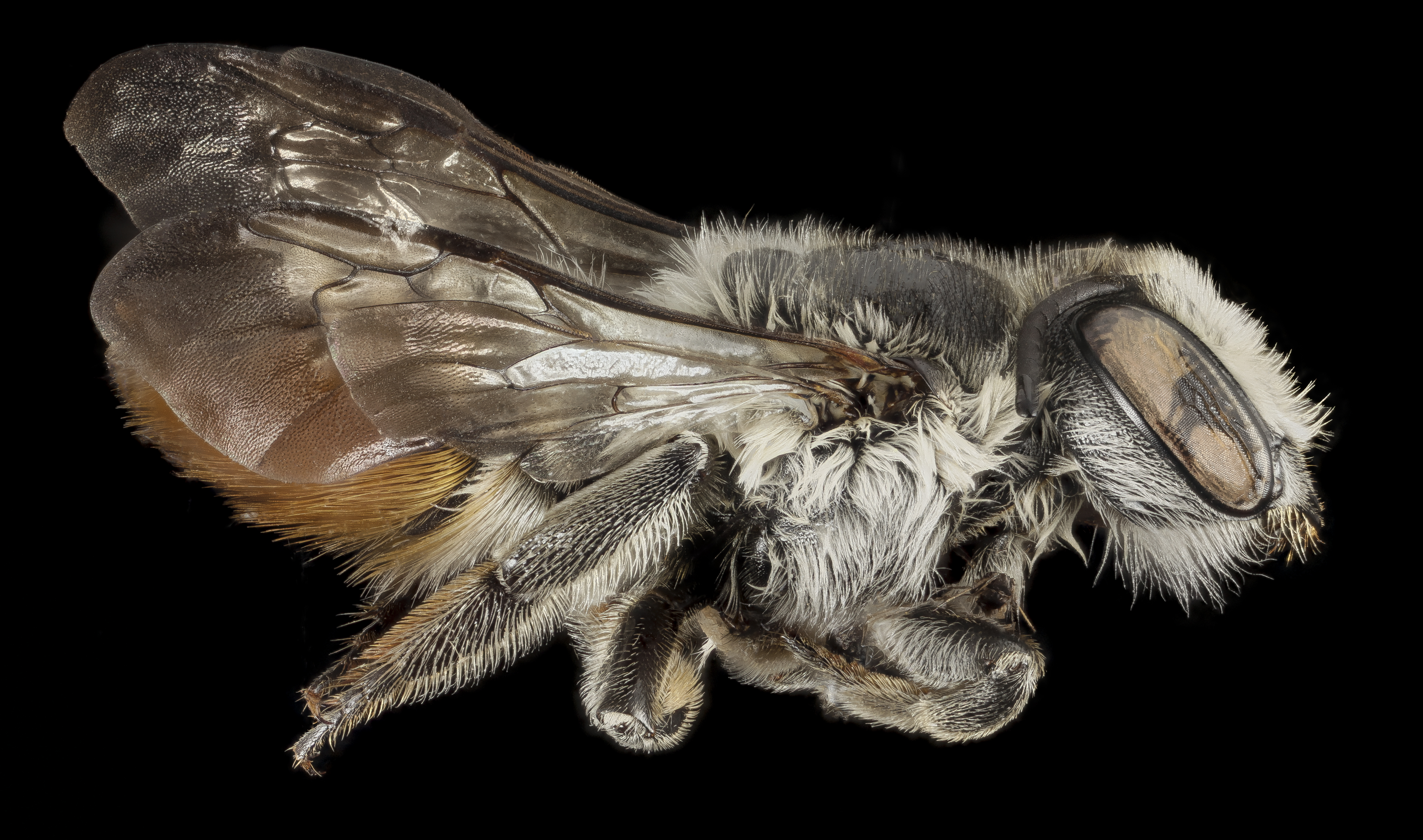

Scientific classification
- Kingdom: Animalia
- Phylum: Arthropoda
- Class: Insecta
- Order: Hymenoptera
- Family: Megachilidae
- Genus: Megachile
- Species: M. chlorura

Binomial name
- Megachile chlorura Cockerell, 1918

= Megachile chlorura =

Species of leafcutter bee (Megachile)

Megachile chlorura is a species of bee in the family Megachilidae. It was described by Theodore Dru Alison Cockerell in 1918.
