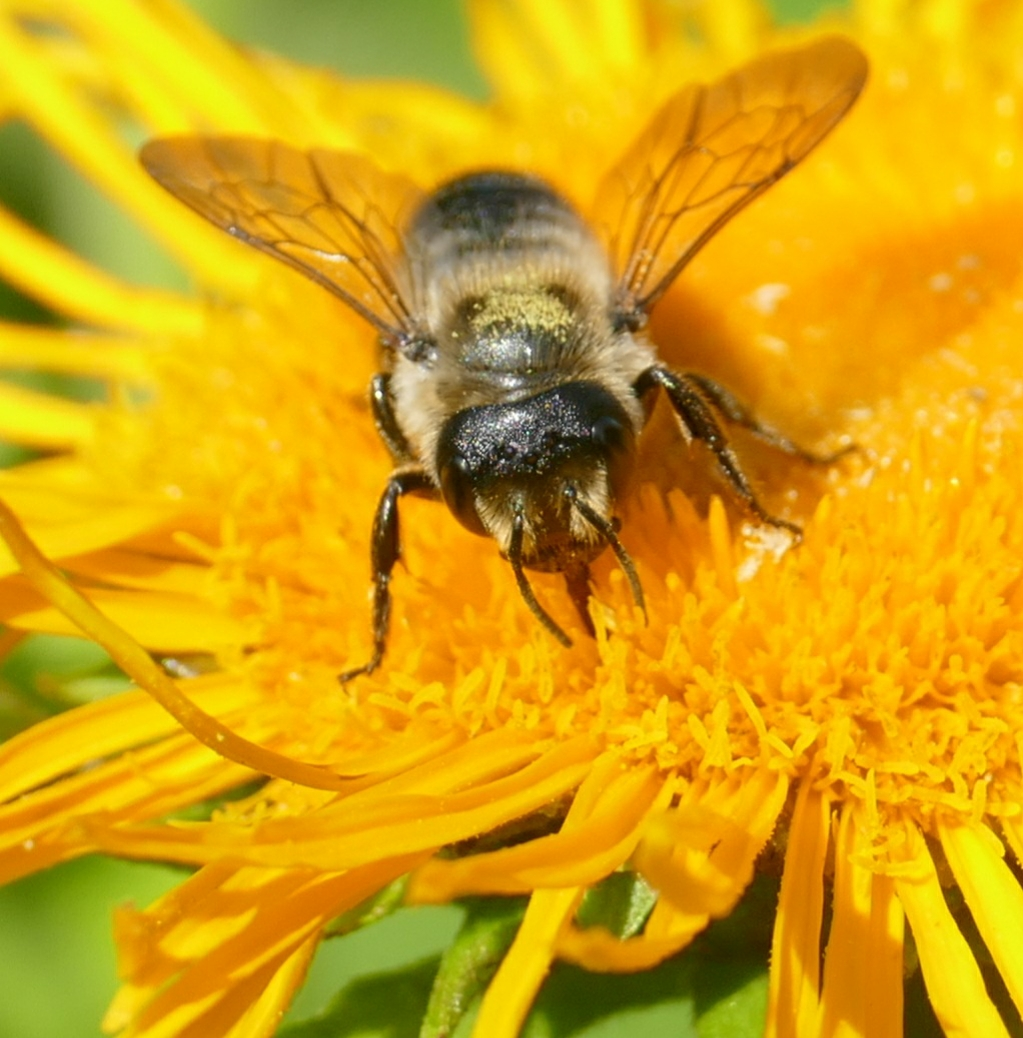

Scientific classification
- Kingdom: Animalia
- Phylum: Arthropoda
- Clade: Pancrustacea
- Class: Insecta
- Order: Hymenoptera
- Family: Megachilidae
- Genus: Megachile
- Species: M. genalis

Binomial name
- Megachile genalis Morawitz, 1880

= Megachile genalis =

Species of leafcutter bee (Megachile)

Megachile genalis is a species of bee in the family Megachilidae. It was described by Morawitz in 1880.

Megachile genalis is very rare in Europe and red-listed in countries like Belgium, the Czech Republique, Germany, Slovakia and Switzerland. One way to identified are there nests in thick, erect and usually hollow plant stems, is rare and endangered throughout Europe.
