= Megachile chrysopygopsis =

Scientific classification
- Kingdom: Animalia
- Phylum: Arthropoda
- Class: Insecta
- Order: Hymenoptera
- Family: Megachilidae
- Genus: Megachile
- Species: M. chrysopygopsis

Binomial name
- Megachile chrysopygopsis Cockerell, 1929

Species of leafcutter bee (Megachile)

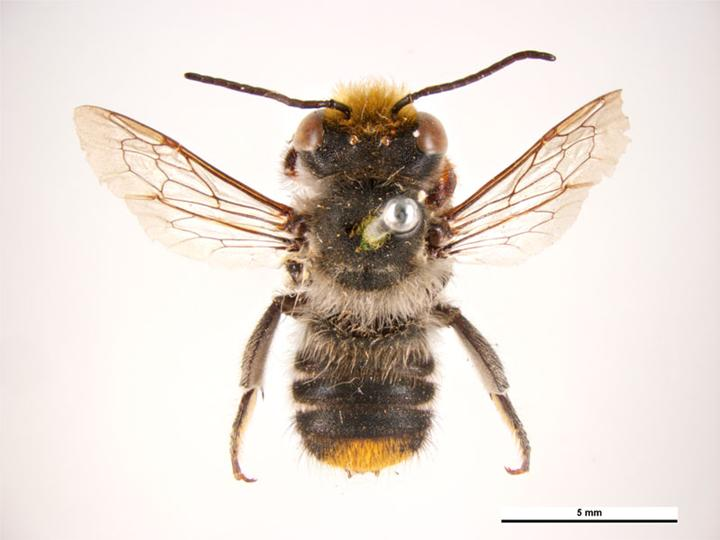
Megachile chrysopygopsis

Megachile chrysopygopsis is a species of bee in the family Megachilidae. It was described by Theodore Dru Alison Cockerell in 1929.
