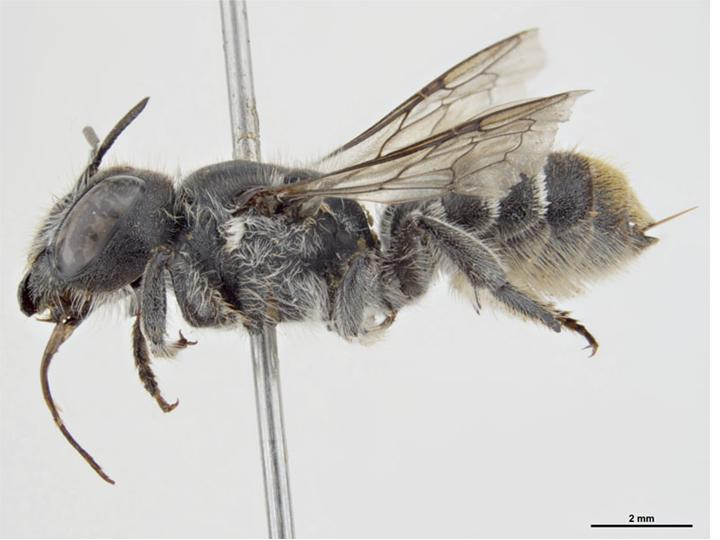
- Megachile latericauda - Female

Scientific classification
- Kingdom: Animalia
- Phylum: Arthropoda
- Class: Insecta
- Order: Hymenoptera
- Family: Megachilidae
- Genus: Megachile
- Species: M. latericauda

Binomial name
- Megachile latericauda Cockerell, 1921

= Megachile latericauda =

Species of leafcutter bee (Megachile)

Megachile latericauda is a species of bee in the family Megachilidae. It was described by Theodore Dru Alison Cockerell in 1921.
