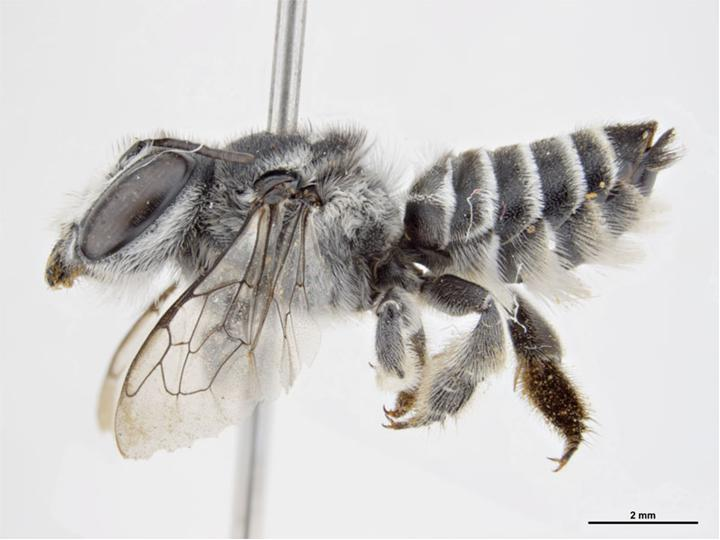

Scientific classification
- Kingdom: Animalia
- Phylum: Arthropoda
- Class: Insecta
- Order: Hymenoptera
- Family: Megachilidae
- Genus: Megachile
- Species: M. tenuicincta

Binomial name
- Megachile tenuicincta Cockerell, 1929

= Megachile tenuicincta =

Species of leafcutter bee (Megachile)

Megachile tenuicincta is a species of bee in the family Megachilidae. It was described by Theodore Dru Alison Cockerell in 1929.
