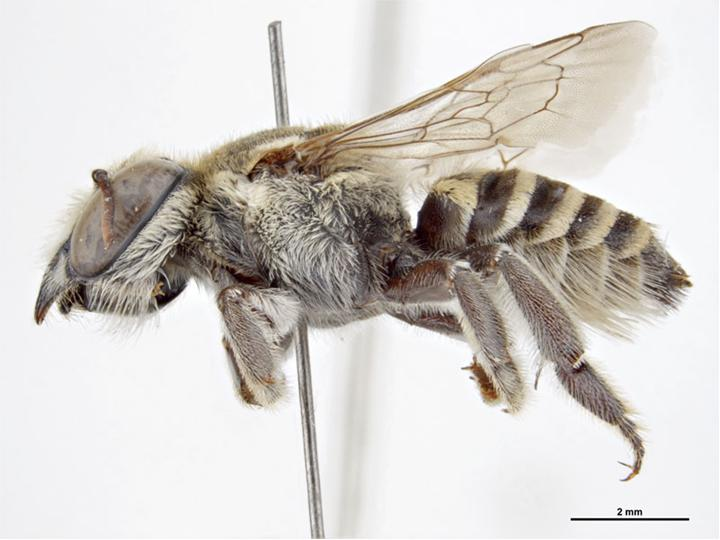

Scientific classification
- Kingdom: Animalia
- Phylum: Arthropoda
- Class: Insecta
- Order: Hymenoptera
- Family: Megachilidae
- Genus: Megachile
- Species: M. gahani

Binomial name
- Megachile gahani Cockerell, 1906

= Megachile gahani =

Species of leafcutter bee (Megachile)

Megachile gahani is a species of bee in the family Megachilidae. It was described by Theodore Dru Alison Cockerell in 1906.
