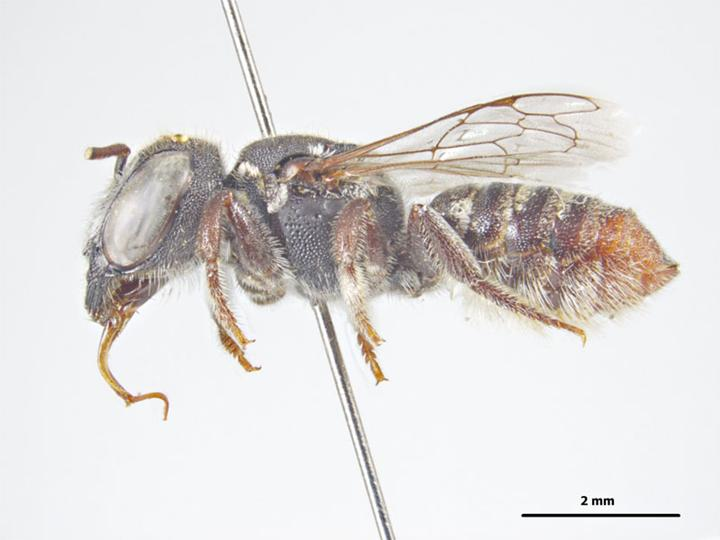

Scientific classification
- Kingdom: Animalia
- Phylum: Arthropoda
- Class: Insecta
- Order: Hymenoptera
- Family: Megachilidae
- Genus: Megachile
- Species: M. callura

Binomial name
- Megachile callura (Cockerell, 1914)

= Megachile callura =

Species of leafcutter bee (Megachile)

Megachile callura is a species of bee in the family Megachilidae. It was described by Theodore Dru Alison Cockerell in 1914.
