= Megachile semierma =

Scientific classification
- Domain: Eukaryota
- Kingdom: Animalia
- Phylum: Arthropoda
- Class: Insecta
- Order: Hymenoptera
- Family: Megachilidae
- Genus: Megachile
- Species: M. semierma

Binomial name
- Megachile semierma Vachal, 1903

Synonyms
- Megachile tsadiana Strand, 1911; Megachile lydenburgiana Strand, 1911; Megachile callichlora Cockerell, 1930 (Nomen nudum); Megachile callichlora Cockerell, 1931; Megachile aliceae Cockerell, 1932; Megachile pretoriaensis Pasteels, 1965; Megachile pycnocephala Pasteels, 1966

Species of leafcutter bee (Megachile)

Megachile semierma is a species of bee in the family Megachilidae. It was described by Vachal in 1903.
