= Megachile nasalis =

Scientific classification
- Domain: Eukaryota
- Kingdom: Animalia
- Phylum: Arthropoda
- Class: Insecta
- Order: Hymenoptera
- Family: Megachilidae
- Genus: Megachile
- Species: M. nasalis

Binomial name
- Megachile nasalis Smith, 1879

Synonyms
- Megachile volkmanni Friese, 1904; Megachile volkmanni nigrescens Friese, 1904; Megachile volkmanni ab. ventrifasciata Strand, 1911; Megachile mesoleuca Cockerell, 1931

Species of leafcutter bee (Megachile)

Megachile nasalis is a species of bee in the family Megachilidae. It was described by Smith in 1879.
