= Megachile coquimbensis =

Scientific classification
- Domain: Eukaryota
- Kingdom: Animalia
- Phylum: Arthropoda
- Class: Insecta
- Order: Hymenoptera
- Family: Megachilidae
- Genus: Megachile
- Species: M. coquimbensis

Binomial name
- Megachile coquimbensis Ruiz, 1938

Species of leafcutter bee (Megachile)

Megachile coquimbensis is a species of bee in the family Megachilidae. It was first described by Ruiz in 1938. The Global Biodiversity Information Facility lists its geographic division as South America; all GBIF-recognized occurrences, as of January, 2022, are attributed to Chile.
