= Megachile santacrucensis =

Scientific classification
- Domain: Eukaryota
- Kingdom: Animalia
- Phylum: Arthropoda
- Class: Insecta
- Order: Hymenoptera
- Family: Megachilidae
- Genus: Megachile
- Species: M. santacrucensis

Binomial name
- Megachile santacrucensis Durante, Abramovich & Lucia, 2006

Species of leafcutter bee (Megachile)

Megachile santacrucensis is a species of bee in the family Megachilidae. It was described by Silvana Patricia Durante, Alberto H. Abrahamovich and Mariano Lucia in 2006.
