= Megachile salsburyana =

Scientific classification
- Domain: Eukaryota
- Kingdom: Animalia
- Phylum: Arthropoda
- Class: Insecta
- Order: Hymenoptera
- Family: Megachilidae
- Genus: Megachile
- Species: M. salsburyana

Binomial name
- Megachile salsburyana Friese, 1922

Synonyms
- Megachile seclusa Cockerell, 1931; Megachile seclusiformis Cockerell, 1931

Species of leafcutter bee (Megachile)

Megachile salsburyana is a species of bee in the family Megachilidae. It was described by Friese in 1922.
