= Megachile longuisetosa =

Scientific classification
- Domain: Eukaryota
- Kingdom: Animalia
- Phylum: Arthropoda
- Class: Insecta
- Order: Hymenoptera
- Family: Megachilidae
- Genus: Megachile
- Species: M. longuisetosa

Binomial name
- Megachile longuisetosa Gonzalez & Griswold, 2007

Species of leafcutter bee (Megachile)

Megachile longuisetosa is a species of bee in the family Megachilidae. It was described by Gonzalez & Griswold in 2007.
