= Megachile mimeticana =

Scientific classification
- Domain: Eukaryota
- Kingdom: Animalia
- Phylum: Arthropoda
- Class: Insecta
- Order: Hymenoptera
- Family: Megachilidae
- Genus: Megachile
- Species: M. mimeticana

Binomial name
- Megachile mimeticana Eardley & R. P. Urban, 2006

Species of leafcutter bee (Megachile)

Megachile mimeticana is a species of bee in the family Megachilidae. It was described by Eardley & R. P. Urban in 2006.
