= Megachile aurulenta =

Scientific classification
- Domain: Eukaryota
- Kingdom: Animalia
- Phylum: Arthropoda
- Class: Insecta
- Order: Hymenoptera
- Family: Megachilidae
- Genus: Megachile
- Species: M. aurulenta

Binomial name
- Megachile aurulenta (Pasteels, 1970)

Species of leafcutter bee (Megachile)

Megachile aurulenta is a species of bee in the family Megachilidae. It was described by Pasteels in 1970. The species is found in South Africa.
