= Megachile okinawana =

Scientific classification
- Domain: Eukaryota
- Kingdom: Animalia
- Phylum: Arthropoda
- Class: Insecta
- Order: Hymenoptera
- Family: Megachilidae
- Genus: Megachile
- Species: M. okinawana

Binomial name
- Megachile okinawana Yasumatsu & Hirashima, 1964

Species of leafcutter bee (Megachile)

Megachile okinawana is a species of bee in the family Megachilidae. It was described by Yasumatsu & Hirashima in 1964.
