= Megachile legalis =

Conservation status
- Vulnerable (NatureServe)

Scientific classification
- Domain: Eukaryota
- Kingdom: Animalia
- Phylum: Arthropoda
- Class: Insecta
- Order: Hymenoptera
- Family: Megachilidae
- Genus: Megachile
- Species: M. legalis

Binomial name
- Megachile legalis Cresson, 1879

Species of leafcutter bee (Megachile)

Megachile legalis is a species of bee in the family Megachilidae. It was described by Cresson in 1879.
