= Megachile bomplandensis =

Scientific classification
- Domain: Eukaryota
- Kingdom: Animalia
- Phylum: Arthropoda
- Class: Insecta
- Order: Hymenoptera
- Family: Megachilidae
- Genus: Megachile
- Species: M. bomplandensis

Binomial name
- Megachile bomplandensis Durante, 1996

Species of leafcutter bee (Megachile)

Megachile bomplandensis is a species of bee in the family Megachilidae. It was described by Silvana Patricia Durante in 1996.
