= Megachile gomphrenae =

Scientific classification
- Domain: Eukaryota
- Kingdom: Animalia
- Phylum: Arthropoda
- Class: Insecta
- Order: Hymenoptera
- Family: Megachilidae
- Genus: Megachile
- Species: M. gomphrenae

Binomial name
- Megachile gomphrenae Holmberg, 1886

Species of leafcutter bee (Megachile)

Megachile gomphrenae is a species of bee in the family Megachilidae. It was described by Holmberg in 1886.
