= Megachile nigropilosa =

Scientific classification
- Domain: Eukaryota
- Kingdom: Animalia
- Phylum: Arthropoda
- Class: Insecta
- Order: Hymenoptera
- Family: Megachilidae
- Genus: Megachile
- Species: M. nigropilosa

Binomial name
- Megachile nigropilosa Schrottky, 1902

Species of leafcutter bee (Megachile)

Megachile nigropilosa is a species of bee in the family Megachilidae. It was described by Schrottky in 1902.
