= Megachile khamana =

Scientific classification
- Domain: Eukaryota
- Kingdom: Animalia
- Phylum: Arthropoda
- Class: Insecta
- Order: Hymenoptera
- Family: Megachilidae
- Genus: Megachile
- Species: M. khamana

Binomial name
- Megachile khamana Cockerell, 1938

Species of leafcutter bee (Megachile)

Megachile khamana is a species of bee in the family Megachilidae. It was described by Theodore Dru Alison Cockerell in 1938.
