= Megachile minutissima =

Scientific classification
- Domain: Eukaryota
- Kingdom: Animalia
- Phylum: Arthropoda
- Class: Insecta
- Order: Hymenoptera
- Family: Megachilidae
- Genus: Megachile
- Species: M. minutissima

Binomial name
- Megachile minutissima Radoszkowski, 1876

Species of leafcutter bee (Megachile)

Megachile minutissima is a species of bee in the family Megachilidae. It was described by Radoszkowski in 1876.
