= Megachile villosa =

Scientific classification
- Domain: Eukaryota
- Kingdom: Animalia
- Phylum: Arthropoda
- Class: Insecta
- Order: Hymenoptera
- Family: Megachilidae
- Genus: Megachile
- Species: M. villosa

Binomial name
- Megachile villosa (Fabricius, 1775)

Species of leafcutter bee (Megachile)

Megachile villosa is a species of bee in the family Megachilidae. It was described by Johan Christian Fabricius in 1775.
