= Megachile bukamensis =

Scientific classification
- Kingdom: Animalia
- Phylum: Arthropoda
- Class: Insecta
- Order: Hymenoptera
- Family: Megachilidae
- Genus: Megachile
- Species: M. bukamensis

Binomial name
- Megachile bukamensis Cockerell, 1935

Species of leafcutter bee (Megachile)

Megachile bukamensis is a species of bee in the family Megachilidae. It was described by Theodore Dru Alison Cockerell in 1935.
