= Megachile gibbidens =

Scientific classification
- Domain: Eukaryota
- Kingdom: Animalia
- Phylum: Arthropoda
- Class: Insecta
- Order: Hymenoptera
- Family: Megachilidae
- Genus: Megachile
- Species: M. gibbidens

Binomial name
- Megachile gibbidens Vachal, 1910

Species of leafcutter bee (Megachile)

Megachile gibbidens is a species of bee in the family Megachilidae. It was described by Vachal in 1910.
