= Megachile derelicta =

Scientific classification
- Kingdom: Animalia
- Phylum: Arthropoda
- Class: Insecta
- Order: Hymenoptera
- Family: Megachilidae
- Genus: Megachile
- Species: M. derelicta

Binomial name
- Megachile derelicta Cockerell, 1913

Species of leafcutter bee (Megachile)

Megachile derelicta is a species of bee in the Megachilidae family. It was first described in 1913 by Theodore Dru Alison Cockerell.
