= Megachile orientalis =

Scientific classification
- Domain: Eukaryota
- Kingdom: Animalia
- Phylum: Arthropoda
- Class: Insecta
- Order: Hymenoptera
- Family: Megachilidae
- Genus: Megachile
- Species: M. orientalis

Binomial name
- Megachile orientalis Morawitz, 1895

Species of leafcutter bee (Megachile)

Megachile orientalis is a species of bee in the family Megachilidae. It was described by Morawitz in 1895.
