= Megachile moureana =

Scientific classification
- Domain: Eukaryota
- Kingdom: Animalia
- Phylum: Arthropoda
- Class: Insecta
- Order: Hymenoptera
- Family: Megachilidae
- Genus: Megachile
- Species: M. moureana

Binomial name
- Megachile moureana Silveira et al., 2002

Species of leafcutter bee (Megachile)

Megachile moureana is a species of bee in the family Megachilidae. It was described by Silveira et al. in 2002.
