= Megachile pauliani =

Scientific classification
- Domain: Eukaryota
- Kingdom: Animalia
- Phylum: Arthropoda
- Class: Insecta
- Order: Hymenoptera
- Family: Megachilidae
- Genus: Megachile
- Species: M. pauliani

Binomial name
- Megachile pauliani Benoist, 1950

Species of leafcutter bee (Megachile)

Megachile pauliani is a species of bee in the family Megachilidae. It was described by Benoist in 1950.
