= Megachile submetallica =

Scientific classification
- Domain: Eukaryota
- Kingdom: Animalia
- Phylum: Arthropoda
- Class: Insecta
- Order: Hymenoptera
- Family: Megachilidae
- Genus: Megachile
- Species: M. submetallica

Binomial name
- Megachile submetallica Benoist, 1955

Species of leafcutter bee (Megachile)

Megachile submetallica is a species of bee in the family Megachilidae. It was described by Benoist in 1955.
