= Megachile alticola =

Scientific classification
- Domain: Eukaryota
- Kingdom: Animalia
- Phylum: Arthropoda
- Class: Insecta
- Order: Hymenoptera
- Family: Megachilidae
- Genus: Megachile
- Species: M. alticola

Binomial name
- Megachile alticola (Cameron, 1902)

Species of leafcutter bee (Megachile)

Megachile alticola is a species of bee in the family Megachilidae. It was described by Cameron in 1902.
