= Megachile armipygata =

Scientific classification
- Domain: Eukaryota
- Kingdom: Animalia
- Phylum: Arthropoda
- Class: Insecta
- Order: Hymenoptera
- Family: Megachilidae
- Genus: Megachile
- Species: M. armipygata

Binomial name
- Megachile armipygata Strand, 1911

Species of leafcutter bee (Megachile)

Megachile armipygata is a species of bee in the family Megachilidae. It was described by Strand in 1911.
