= Megachile nigra =

Scientific classification
- Domain: Eukaryota
- Kingdom: Animalia
- Phylum: Arthropoda
- Class: Insecta
- Order: Hymenoptera
- Family: Megachilidae
- Genus: Megachile
- Species: M. nigra

Binomial name
- Megachile nigra Schulten, 1977

Species of leafcutter bee (Megachile)

Megachile nigra is a species of bee in the family Megachilidae. It was described by Schulten in 1977.
