= Megachile temora =

Scientific classification
- Domain: Eukaryota
- Kingdom: Animalia
- Phylum: Arthropoda
- Class: Insecta
- Order: Hymenoptera
- Family: Megachilidae
- Genus: Megachile
- Species: M. temora

Binomial name
- Megachile temora Cameron, 1905

Species of leafcutter bee (Megachile)

Megachile temora is a species of bee in the family Megachilidae. It was described by Cameron in 1905.
