= Megachile saba =

Scientific classification
- Domain: Eukaryota
- Kingdom: Animalia
- Phylum: Arthropoda
- Class: Insecta
- Order: Hymenoptera
- Family: Megachilidae
- Genus: Megachile
- Species: M. saba

Binomial name
- Megachile saba Strand, 1914

Species of leafcutter bee (Megachile)

Megachile saba is a species of bee in the family Megachilidae. It was described by Strand in 1914.
