= Megachile fabricator =

Scientific classification
- Kingdom: Animalia
- Phylum: Arthropoda
- Class: Insecta
- Order: Hymenoptera
- Family: Megachilidae
- Genus: Megachile
- Species: M. fabricator

Binomial name
- Megachile fabricator Smith, 1868

Species of leafcutter bee (Megachile)

Megachile fabricator is a species of bee in the family Megachilidae. It was described by Smith in 1868.
