= List of mammals of Ireland =

There are 53 mammal species native to Ireland or naturalised in both the Republic of Ireland and Northern Ireland before 1500, of which 27 are terrestrial mammals and 26 are marine mammals. According to the Ireland Red List of terrestrial mammals in 2019, locally, the black rat is listed as vulnerable, the grey wolf is extinct, and the remaining 25 terrestrial mammals are least concern. Not assessed were nine mammal species that were introduced after 1500.

Icons which state each species' global IUCN status:
CR	Critically Endangered	In imminent risk of extinction in the wild
EN	Endangered	Facing an extremely high risk of extinction in the wild
VU	Vulnerable	Facing a high risk of extinction in the wild
NT	Near Threatened	Doesn't meet any criteria that would categorise it as risking extinction but likely to in the future
LC	Least Concern	No current identifiable risks to this species
DD	Data Deficient	Inadequate information to make an assessment of the risks to this species

This article is based on the Ireland Red List No. 12: Terrestrial Mammals for terrestrial mammals, and the Irish Whale and Dolphin Group list for marine mammals, unless otherwise referenced. This article refers to species' global IUCN conservation status (as opposed to local status). "Introduced" means a species is not native to Ireland and was introduced after 1500 CE. "Naturalised" means a species is not native to Ireland, but was introduced before 1500 CE, and thus is not invasive. "Vagrant" means a marine species which doesn't have an established population in Ireland, but occasionally appears there.

== Diprotodontia (kangaroos and wallabies) ==
Although marsupials are only native to Australasia and the Americas, the red-necked wallaby has been introduced to Ireland: a population has been breeding on Lambay Island since the 1950s.

Family: Macropodidae (kangaroos, wallabies, etc)

Genus: Notamacropus
- Red-necked wallaby – Notamacropus rufogriseus LC (introduced)

== Rodentia (rodents) ==
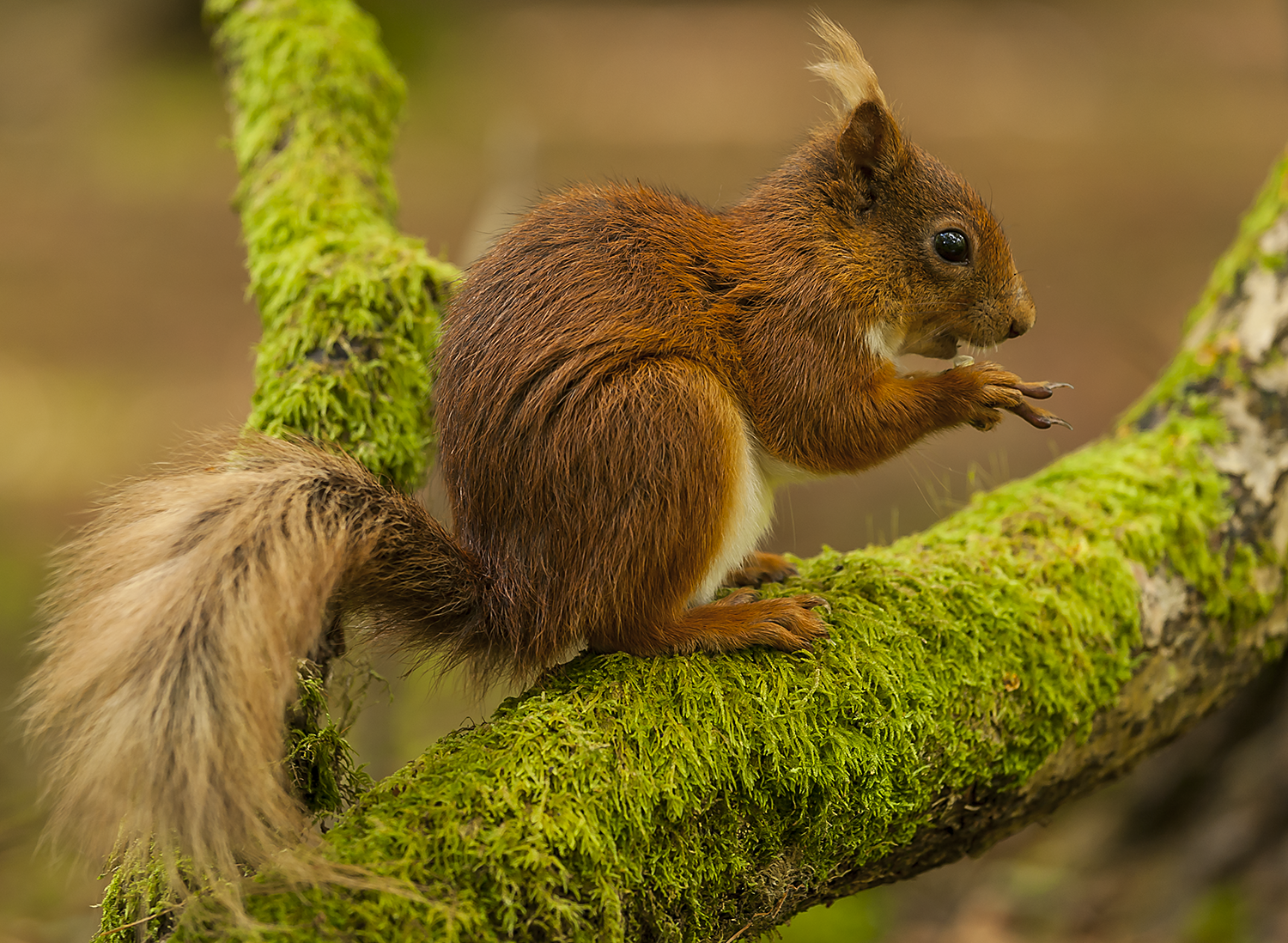
Red squirrel in County Donegal. Native red squirrels in Ireland and Britain have lighter tails and ears than the rest of their body. 43% of red squirrels in Ireland are non-native red squirrels from mainland Europe which do not have this trait

Ireland has 9 species of rodent: 3 native, 1 naturalised, and 5 introduced. Rodents are the largest order of mammals, making up over 40% of mammal species globally. They have two incisors in the upper and lower jaw which grow continually and must be kept short by gnawing.

Suborder: Sciurognathi
Family: Sciuridae (squirrels)

Subfamily: Sciurinae
Genus: Sciurus
- Eastern grey squirrel – Sciurus carolinensis LC (introduced)
- Red squirrel – Sciurus vulgaris LC

Family: Cricetidae (voles)

Subfamily: Arvicolinae
Genus: Clethrionomys
- Bank vole – Clethrionomys glareolus LC (introduced)
Genus: Microtus
- Field vole – Microtus agrestis LC (introduced)

Family: Muridae (mice, rats, etc)

Subfamily: Murinae
Genus: Apodemus
- Wood mouse – Apodemus sylvaticus LC
Genus: Mus
- House mouse – Mus musculus LC
Genus: Rattus
- Brown rat – Rattus norvegicus LC (introduced)
- Black rat – Rattus rattus LC (naturalised)

Family: Gliridae (dormice)

Subfamily: Leithiinae
Genus: Muscardinus
- Hazel dormouse – Muscardinus avellanarius LC (introduced)

== Lagomorpha (lagomorphs) ==
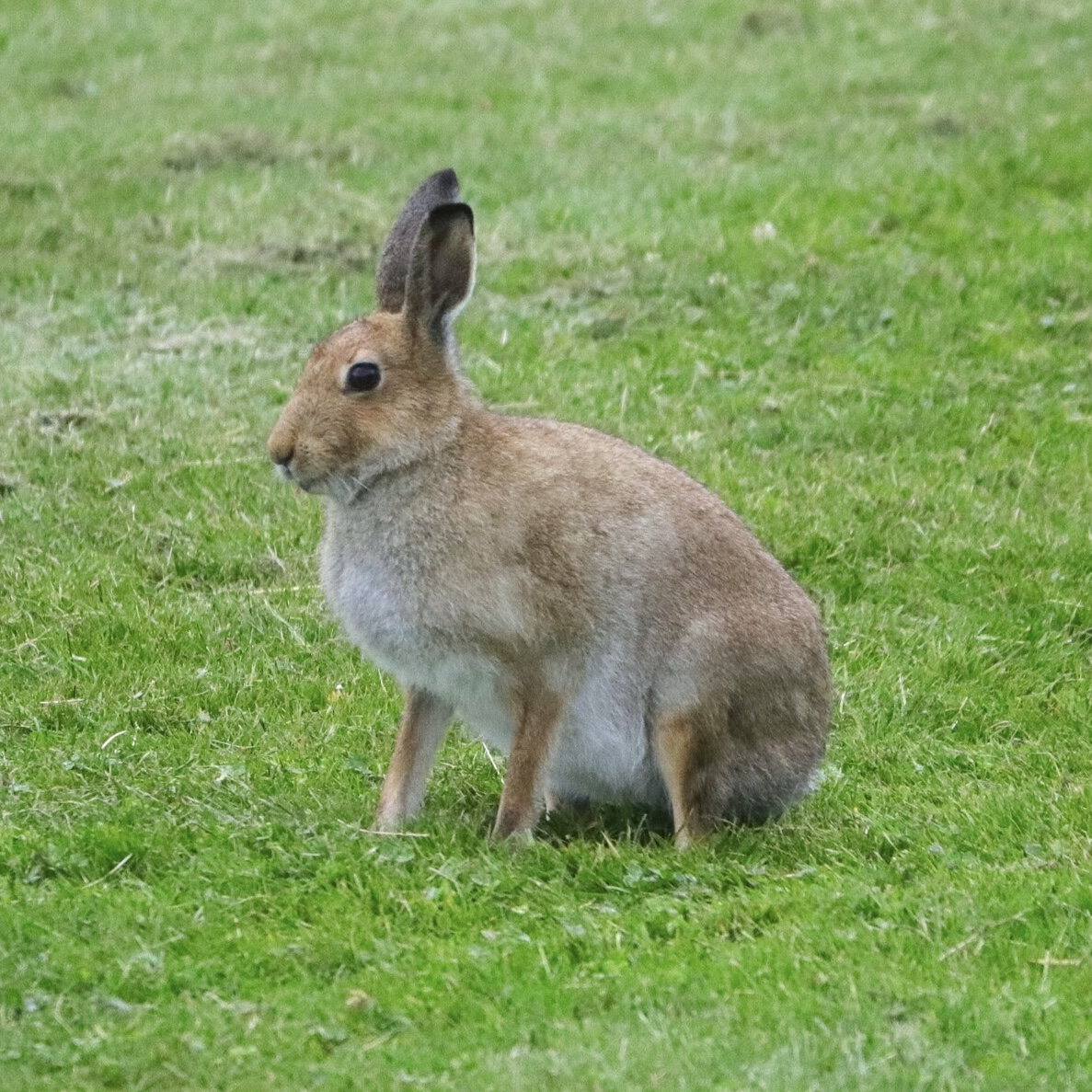
Irish hare – an endemic subspecies of mountain hare – in County Dublin

Ireland has 3 species of lagomorph: 1 native, 1 naturalised, and 1 introduced. Although lagomorphs can resemble rodents, and were classified as a superfamily in that order until the early 20th century, they have since been considered a separate order. They differ from rodents in a number of physical characteristics, such as having four incisors in the upper jaw rather than two.

Family: Leporidae (rabbits, hares)

Genus: Lepus
- European hare – Lepus europaeus LC (introduced)
- Irish hare – Lepus timidus hibernicus LC
Genus: Oryctolagus
- European rabbit – Oryctolagus cuniculus NT (naturalised)

== Artiodactyla (even-toed ungulates) ==
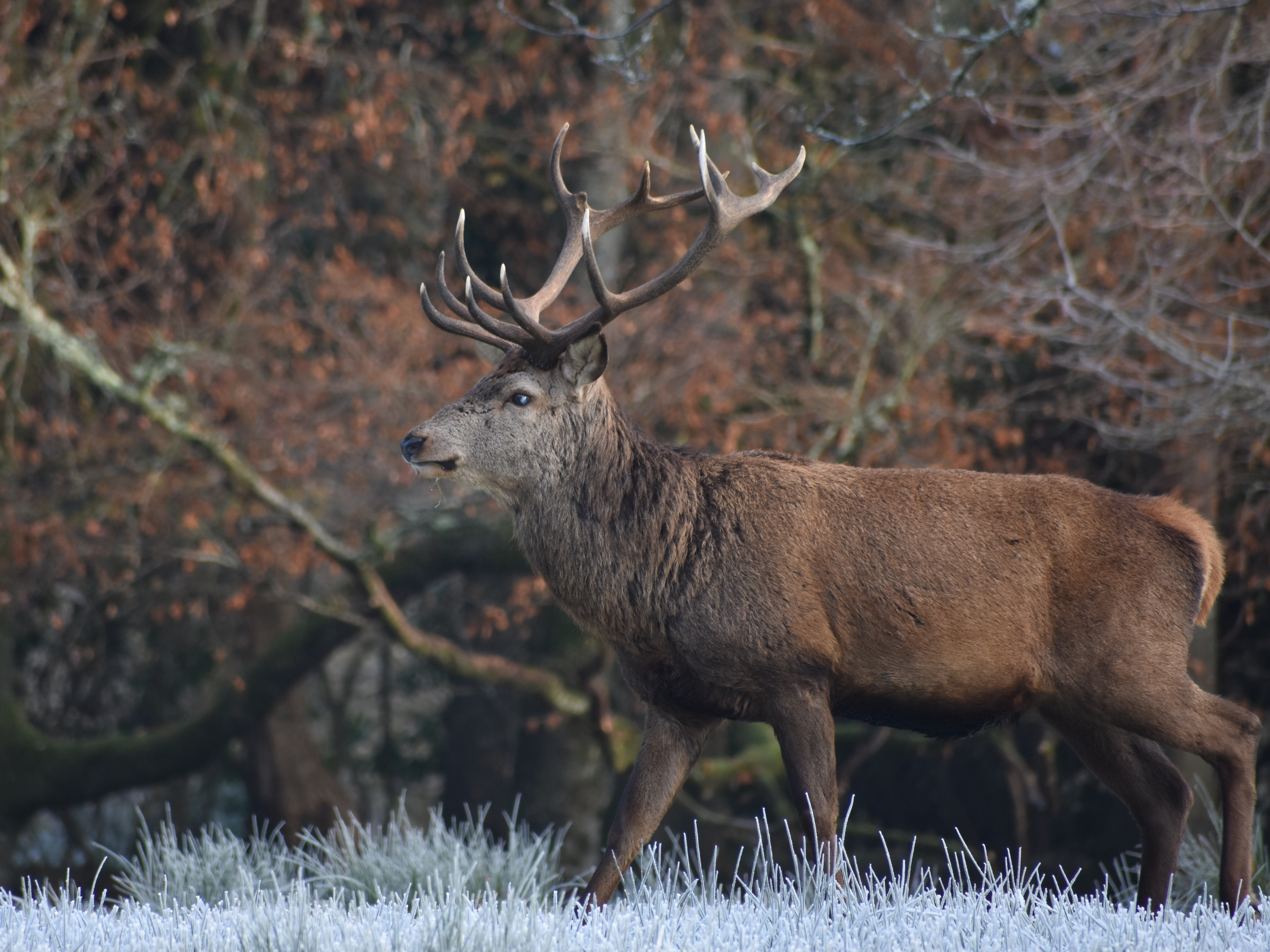
Red deer in Killarney National Park

Ireland has 6 species of even-toed ungulate: 1 native, 1 naturalised, and 4 introduced. The even-toed ungulates are ungulates whose weight is borne about equally by the third and fourth toes, rather than mostly or entirely by the third as in perissodactyls. There are about 220 artiodactyl species globally, including many that are of great economic importance to humans.

Family: Cervidae (deer)

Subfamily: Cervinae
Genus: Cervus
- Red deer – Cervus elaphus LC
- Sika deer – Cervus nippon LC (introduced)
Genus: Dama
- European fallow deer – Dama dama LC (naturalised)
Subfamily: Capreolinae
Genus: Capreolus
- Roe deer – Capreolus capreolus LC (introduced)
Genus: Muntiacus
- Reeves's muntjac – Muntiacus reevesi LC (introduced)

Family: Bovidae (bovids)

Subfamily: Caprinae
Genus: Capra
- Feral goat (including Irish goat) – Capra hircus (introduced)

== Eulipotyphla (hedgehogs, shrews and moles) ==
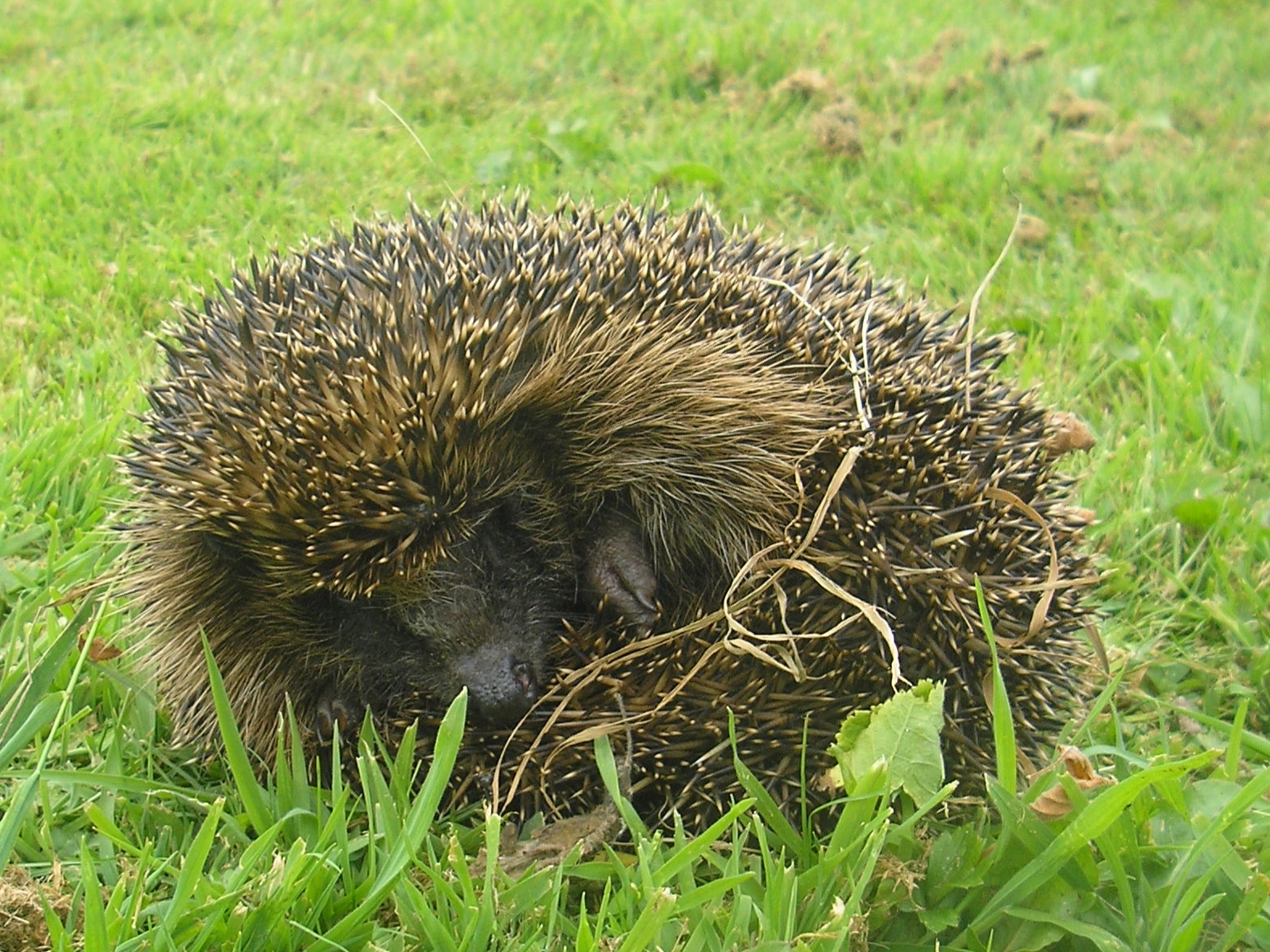
European hedgehog in County Kilkenny

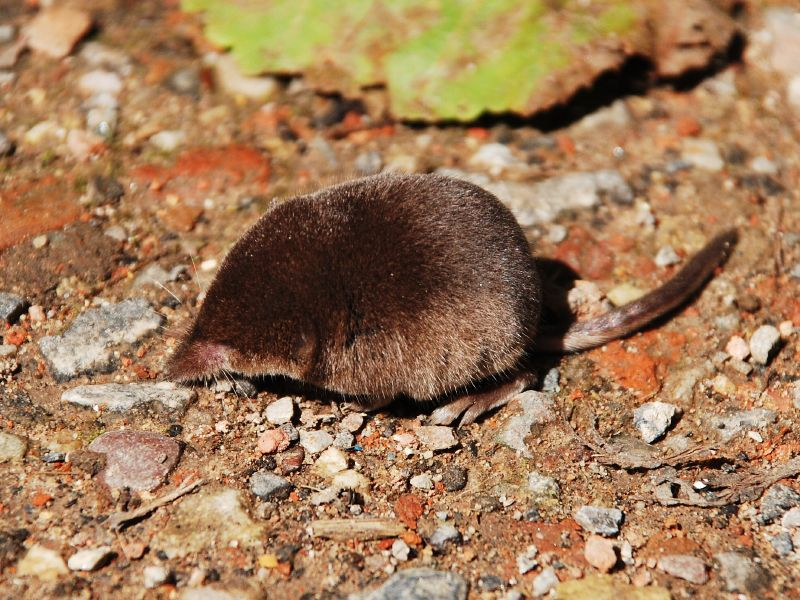
Eurasian pygmy shrew

Ireland has 3 species of Eulipotyphla: 2 native, and 1 introduced. The order Eulipotyphla contains the hedgehogs, shrews, and moles. Hedgehogs are easily recognised by their spines, shrews closely resemble mice, while moles (which are absent from Ireland) are stout-bodied burrowers.

Family: Erinaceidae (hedgehogs)

Subfamily: Erinaceinae
Genus: Erinaceus
- European hedgehog – Erinaceus europaeus NT

Family: Soricidae (shrews)

Subfamily: Soricinae
Genus: Crocidura
- Greater white-toothed shrew – Crocidura russula LC (introduced)
Genus: Sorex
- Eurasian pygmy shrew – Sorex minutus LC

== Chiroptera (bats) ==
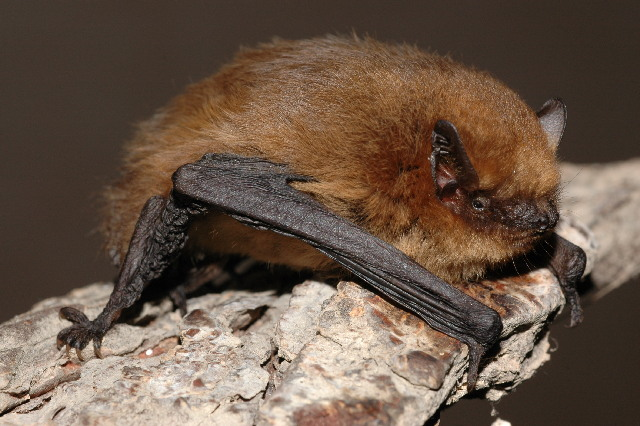
Soprano pipistrelle

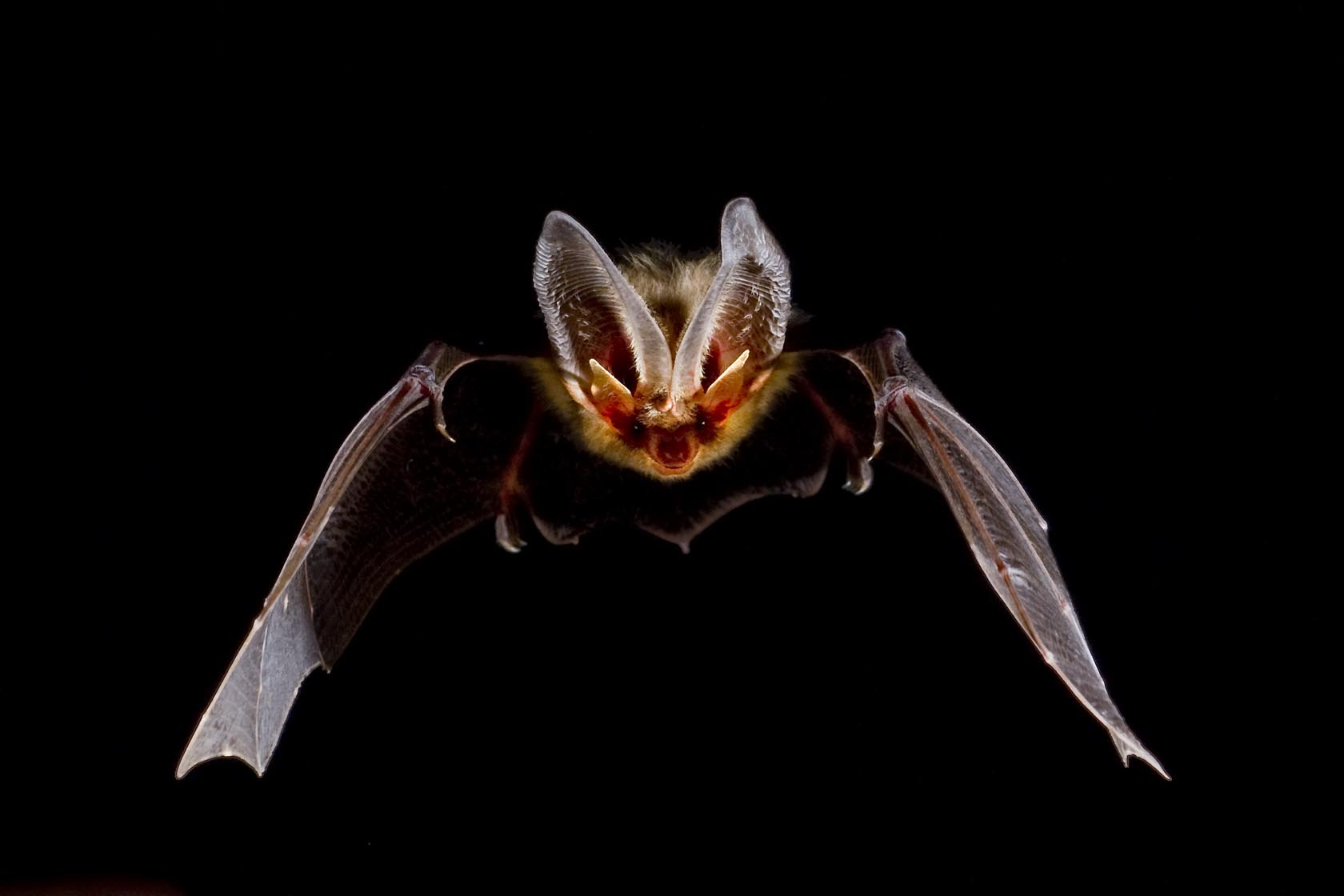
Brown long-eared bat

Ireland has 9 species of bat: all are native. The bats' most distinguishing feature is that their forelimbs are developed as wings, making them the only mammals capable of flight. Bat species account for about 20% of all mammal species globally.

Family: Vespertilionidae (vesper bats)

Subfamily: Myotinae
Genus: Myotis
- Daubenton's bat – Myotis daubentonii LC
- Whiskered bat – Myotis mystacinus LC
- Natterer's bat – Myotis nattereri LC
Subfamily: Vespertilioninae
Genus: Nyctalus
- Lesser noctule – Nyctalus leisleri LC
Genus: Pipistrellus
- Nathusius' pipistrelle – Pipistrellus nathusii LC
- Common pipistrelle – Pipistrellus pipistrellus LC
- Soprano pipistrelle – Pipistrellus pygmaeus LC
Genus: Plecotus
- Brown long-eared bat – Plecotus auritus LC

Family: Rhinolophidae (horseshoe bats)

Subfamily: Rhinolophinae
Genus: Rhinolophus
- Lesser horseshoe bat – Rhinolophus hipposideros LC

== Carnivora (carnivorans) ==
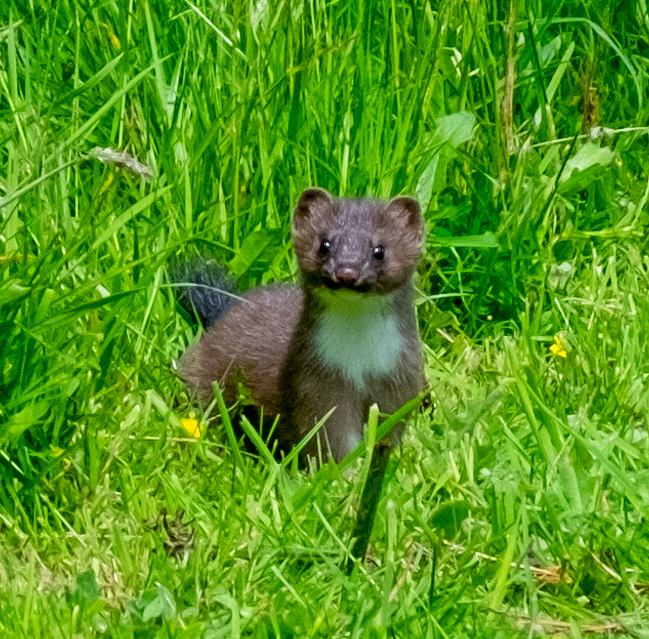
Irish stoat – an endemic subspecies of stoat – in County Down

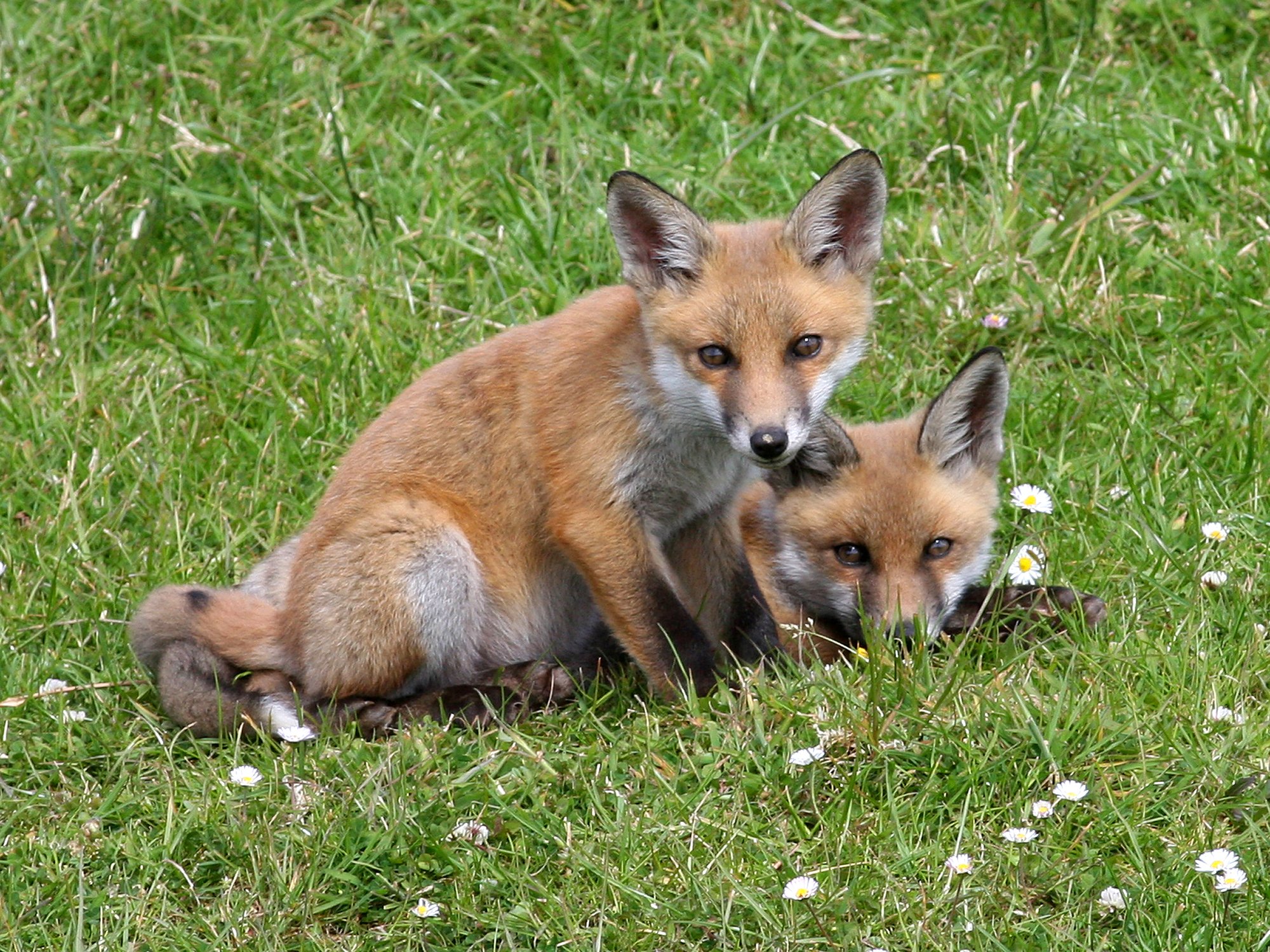
Red fox cubs in County Cork. Red foxes are the only canids native to Ireland

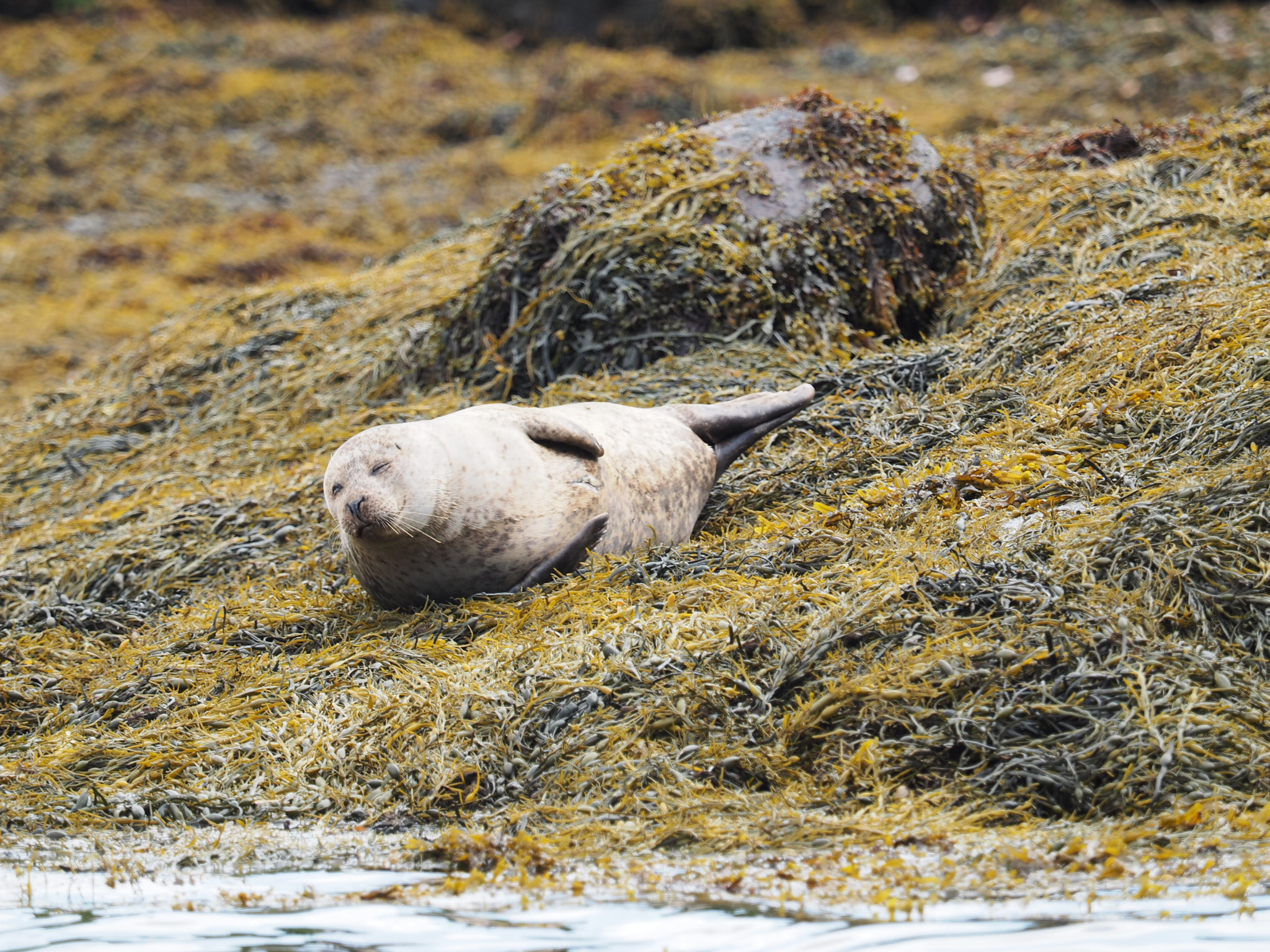
Harbour seal in County Cork

Ireland has 14 species of carnivoran: 12 native, and 2 introduced. Carnivorans include over 260 species globally, the majority of which eat meat as their primary dietary item. They have a characteristic skull shape and dentition.

Suborder: Caniformia
Family: Canidae (dogs, foxes)

Genus: Vulpes
- Red fox – Vulpes vulpes LC

Family: Mustelidae (mustelids)

Genus: Lutra
- European otter – Lutra lutra NT
Genus: Martes
- European pine marten – Martes martes LC
Genus: Meles
- European badger – Meles meles LC
Genus: Mustela
- Irish stoat – Mustela erminea hibernica LC
- Feral ferret – Mustela furo (introduced)
Genus: Neogale
- American mink – Neogale vison LC (introduced)

Family: Phocidae (earless seals)

Genus: Halichoerus
- Grey seal – Halichoerus grypus LC
Genus: Phoca
- Harbour seal – Phoca vitulina LC
Genus: Cystophora
- Hooded seal – Cystophora cristatus EN (vagrant)
Genus: Erignathus
- Bearded seal – Erignathus barbatus NT (vagrant)
Genus: Pagophilus
- Harp seal – Pagophilus groenlandicus NT (vagrant)
Genus: Pusa
- Ringed seal – Pusa hispida LC (vagrant)

Family: Odobenidae (walruses)

Genus: Odobenus
- Walrus – Odobenus rosmarus VU (vagrant)

== Cetacea (whales) ==
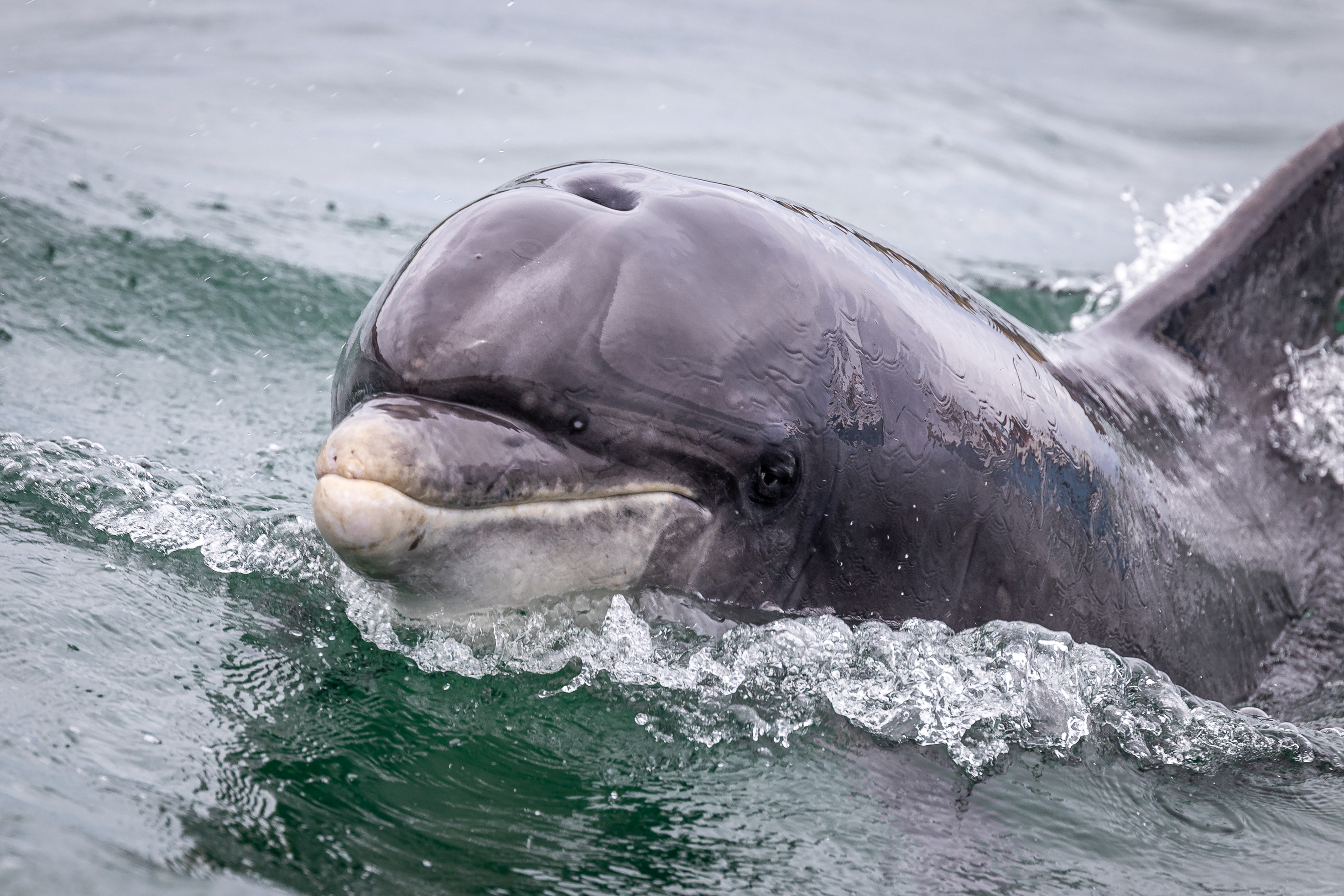
Fungie – a famous Irish bottlenose dolphin – in Dingle

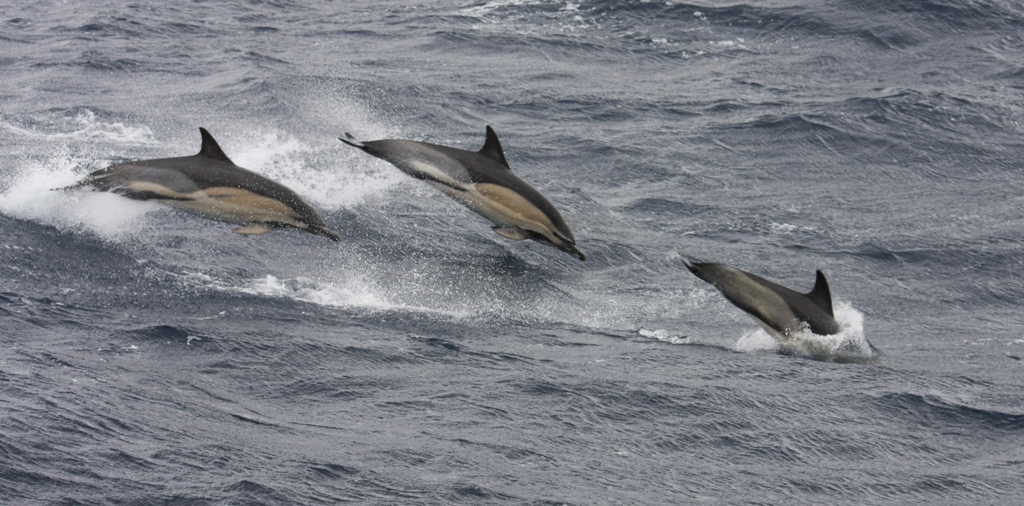
Common dolphins in the Porcupine Seabight, southwest from County Kerry

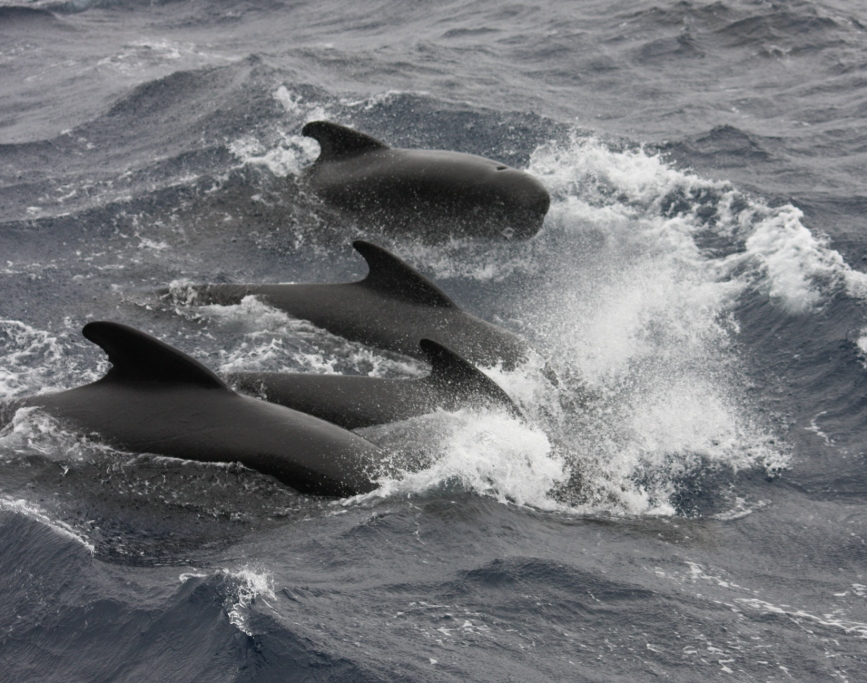
Long-finned pilot whales in the Porcupine Seabight

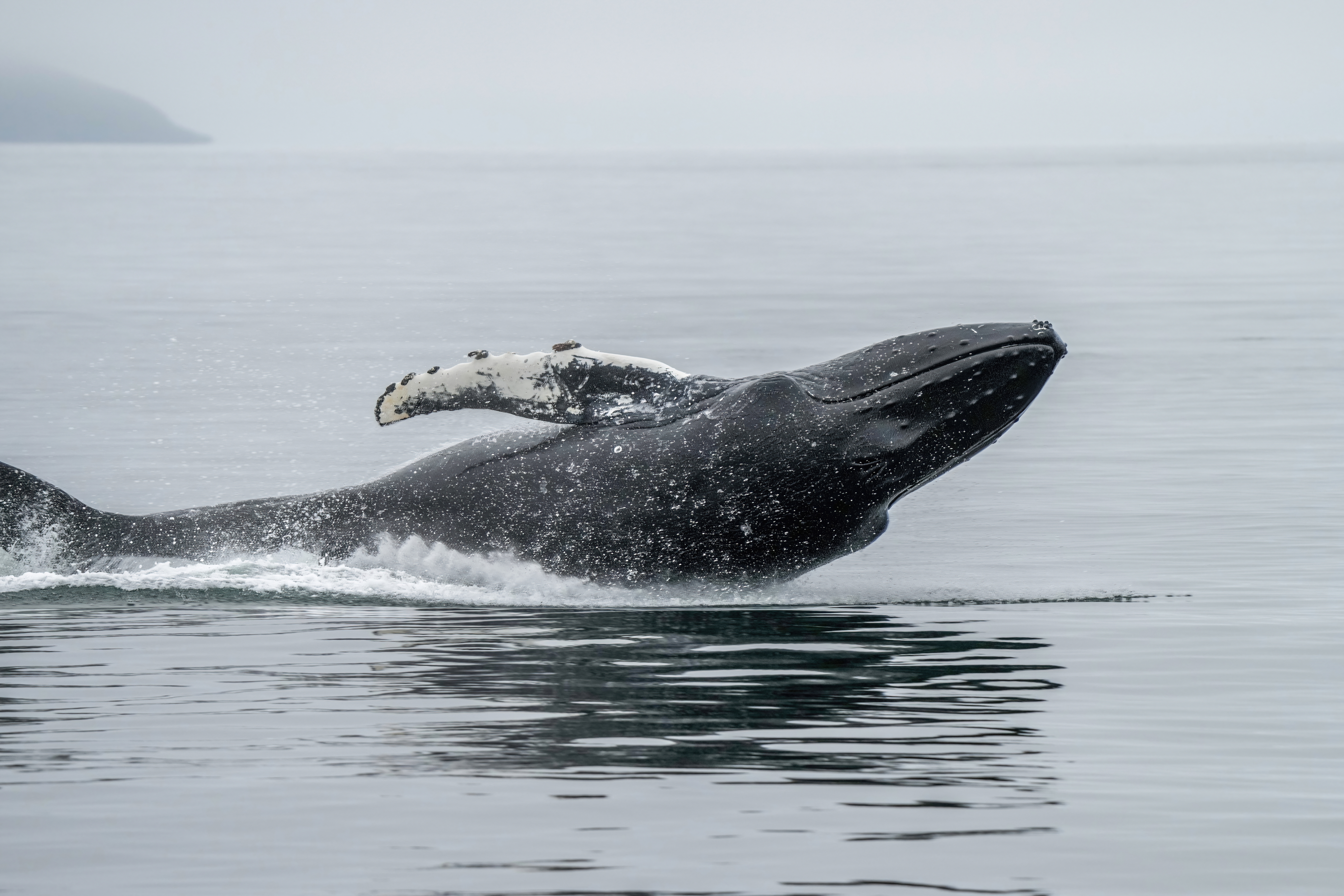
Humpback whale breaching

Ireland has 25 cetaceans: all are native. The order Cetacea includes whales, dolphins, and porpoises. They are the mammals most fully adapted to aquatic life with a spindle-shaped, nearly hairless body protected by a thick layer of blubber, and forelimbs and tail modified to provide propulsion underwater.

Suborder: Mysticeti (baleen whales)
Family: Balaenidae

Genus: Balaena
- Bowhead whale – Balaena mysticetus LC (vagrant)
Genus: Eubalaena
- North Atlantic right whale – Eubalaena glacialis CR (vagrant)

Family: Balaenopteridae (rorquals)

Genus: Balaenoptera
- Common minke whale – Balaenoptera acutorostrata LC
- Sei whale – Balaenoptera borealis EN
- Blue whale – Balaenoptera musculus EN
- Fin whale – Balaenoptera physalus VU
Genus: Megaptera
- Humpback whale – Megaptera novaeangliae LC

Suborder: Odontoceti (toothed whales)
Superfamily: Delphinoidea
Family: Delphinidae (marine dolphins)

Genus: Delphinus
- Common dolphin – Delphinus delphis LC
Genus: Globicephala
- Long-finned pilot whale – Globicephala melas LC
Genus: Grampus
- Risso's dolphin – Grampus griseus LC
Genus: Lagenorhynchus
- White-beaked dolphin – Lagenorhynchus albirostris LC
Genus: Leucopleurus
- Atlantic white-sided dolphin – Leucopleurus acutus LC
Genus: Orcinus
- Orca – Orcinus orca DD
Genus: Pseudorca
- False killer whale – Pseudorca crassidens NT
Genus: Stenella
- Striped dolphin – Stenella coeruleoalba LC
Genus: Tursiops
- Common bottlenose dolphin – Tursiops truncatus LC

Family: Monodontidae

Genus: Delphinapterus
- Beluga – Delphinapterus leucas LC (vagrant)

Family: Phocoenidae (porpoises)

Genus: Phocoena
- Harbour porpoise – Phocoena phocoena LC

Superfamily: Physeteroidea
Family: Physeteridae

Genus: Physeter
- Sperm whale – Physeter macrocephalus VU

Family: Kogiidae

Genus: Kogia
- Pygmy sperm whale – Kogia breviceps LC

Superfamily: Ziphioidea
Family: Ziphidae (beaked whales)

Genus: Ziphius
- Cuvier's beaked whale – Ziphius cavirostris LC
Subfamily: Hyperoodontinae
Genus: Hyperoodon
- Northern bottlenose whale – Hyperoodon ampullatus NT
Genus: Mesoplodon
- Sowerby's beaked whale – Mesoplodon bidens LC
- Gervais' beaked whale – Mesoplodon europaeus LC
- True's beaked whale – Mesoplodon mirus LC

== Locally extinct ==
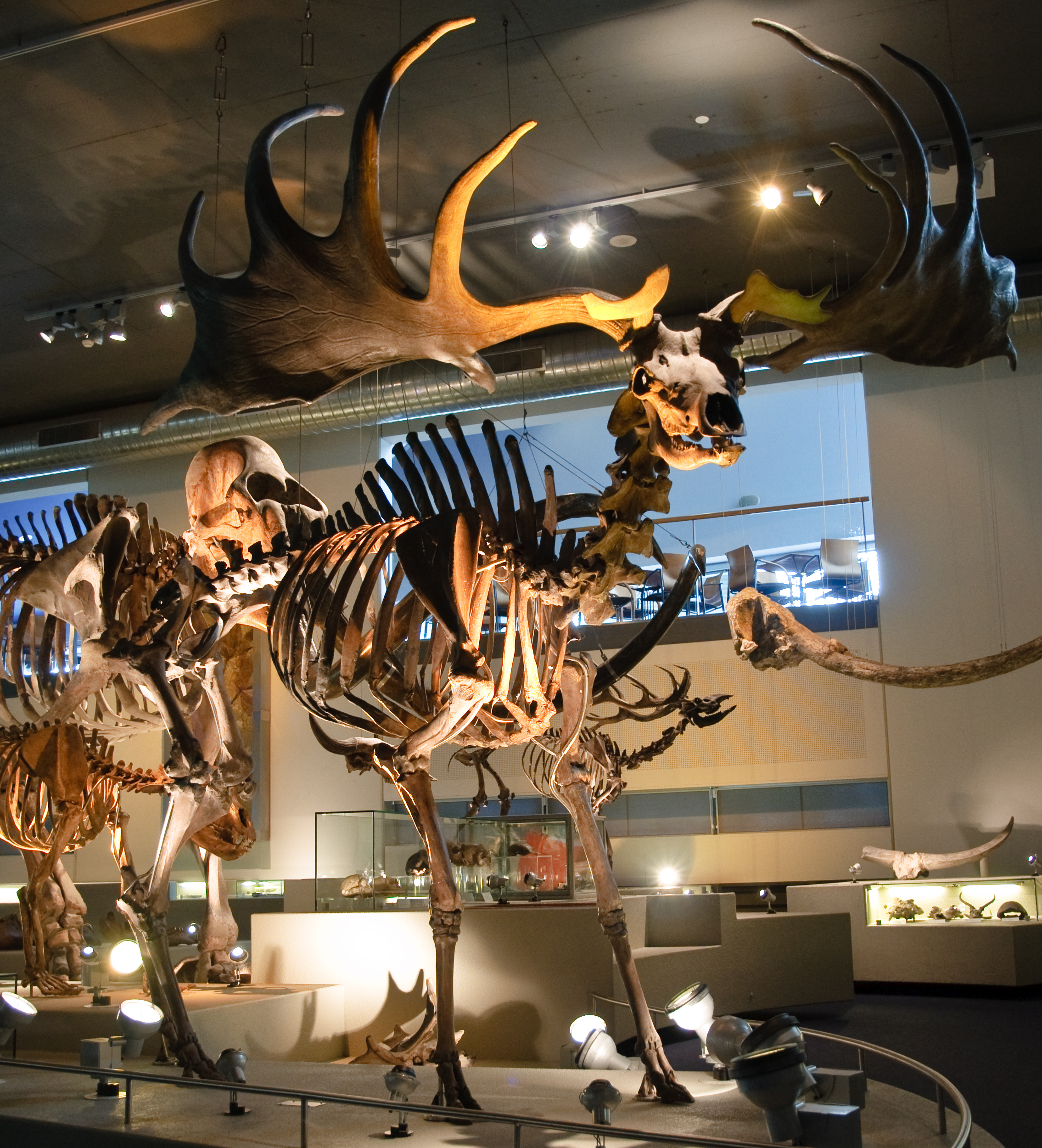
Fossil of the extinct Irish elk.

The following species are locally extinct in the country:

- Wolf – Canis lupus, see Wolves in Ireland
- Eurasian lynx – Lynx lynx
- Reindeer – Rangifer tarandus
- Wild boar – Sus scrofa
- Brown bear – Ursus arctos, see Bears in Ireland

== Globally extinct ==
The following species were present in Ireland, and are now extinct globally:

- Irish elk – Megaloceros giganteus
- Woolly mammoth – Mammuthus primigenius
- Cave hyena – Crocuta spelaea

== See also ==
- Lists of mammals by region
- List of mammals of Great Britain
- Fauna of Ireland
- Deer of Ireland
- Wolves in Ireland
- Bears in Ireland
- Mammal classification
