= Whale watching in Australia =

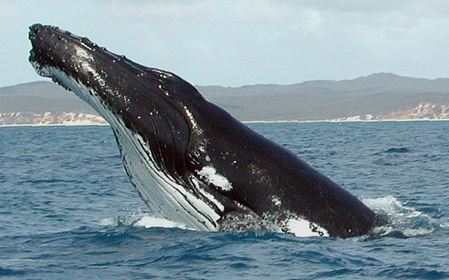
Humpback whale, Platypus Bay, Queensland

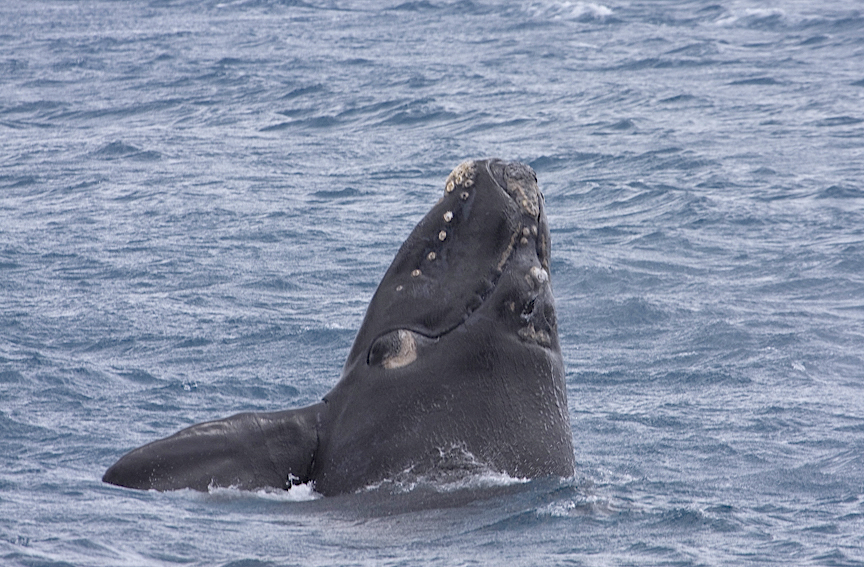
Southern right whale (Eubalaena australis), offshore from Cheynes, Western Australia

Whale watching in Australia is a popular recreational pursuit and a tourist activity along various coasts. In 2008, whale and dolphin watching was worth an estimated A$31 million in direct expenditure to the Australian economy with an estimated 1.6 million tourists participating in the activity. Humpback whales are the most common species seen in the waters surrounding Australia while southern right whales, minke whales and blue whales are also seen.

Whaling in Australia took place from 1788 to 1978 and was once commercially successful. The Australian Whale Sanctuary, which includes all of the Australian Exclusive Economic Zone (EEZ), was established in 1999 to protect dolphins and whales from hunting.

Whale watchers are restricted to approaches as close as 300 metres (984 ft) in order to protect the animals.

== West coast ==
Whales breaching in King George Sound September 2015

In Western Australia, whales are watched near Cape Naturaliste in the south-east Indian Ocean and at Cape Leeuwin where the Indian and Southern Oceans meet. Whale watching cruises operate along the west coast around Perth and Fremantle and as far north as Broome.

== South coast ==
In the Southern Ocean there are many spots to see whales, both from land or aboard ship. Southern right whales are seen June–August along the south coast of Australia. They are often readily viewed from the coast around Encounter Bay near Victor Harbor and up to a hundred at a time may be seen from the cliff tops at the head of the Great Australian Bight near Yalata. Albany on the south coast of Western Australia the town where the last land based whaling station in the Southern Hemisphere was located is now home to a thriving whale watching industry. In Victoria a popular site is Logan's Beach at Warrnambool, as well as in the waters off Port Fairy and Portland. In Tasmania whales can be seen all along the east coast and even on the River Derwent. In South Australia whales are watched in the Great Australian Bight Marine Park areas and closer to Adelaide at Victor Harbor. During a good season it is estimated that approximately 400,000 people visit the region around Encounter Bay and spend some time whale watching.

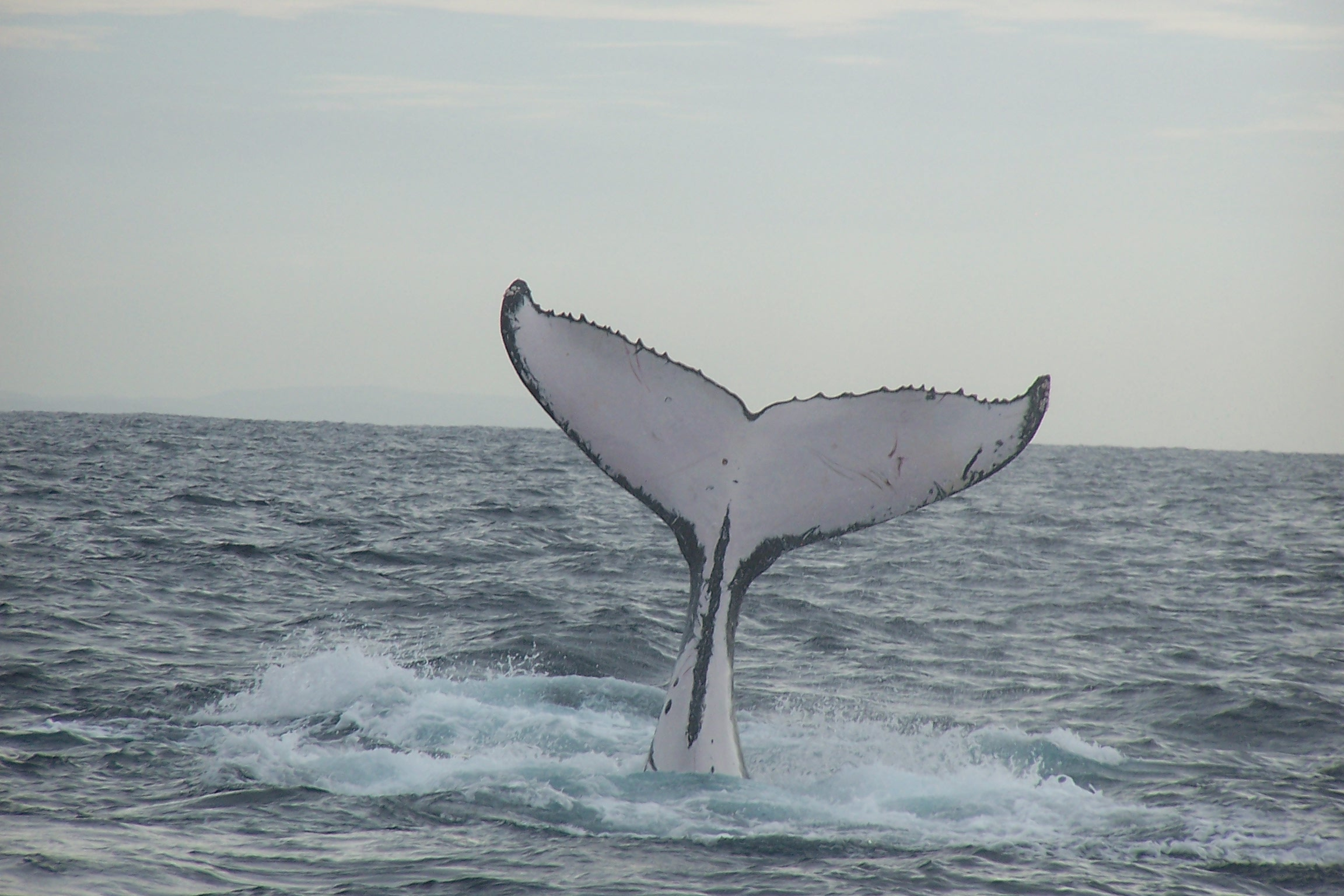
Humpback whale fluke, seen off Surfers Paradise

== East coast ==
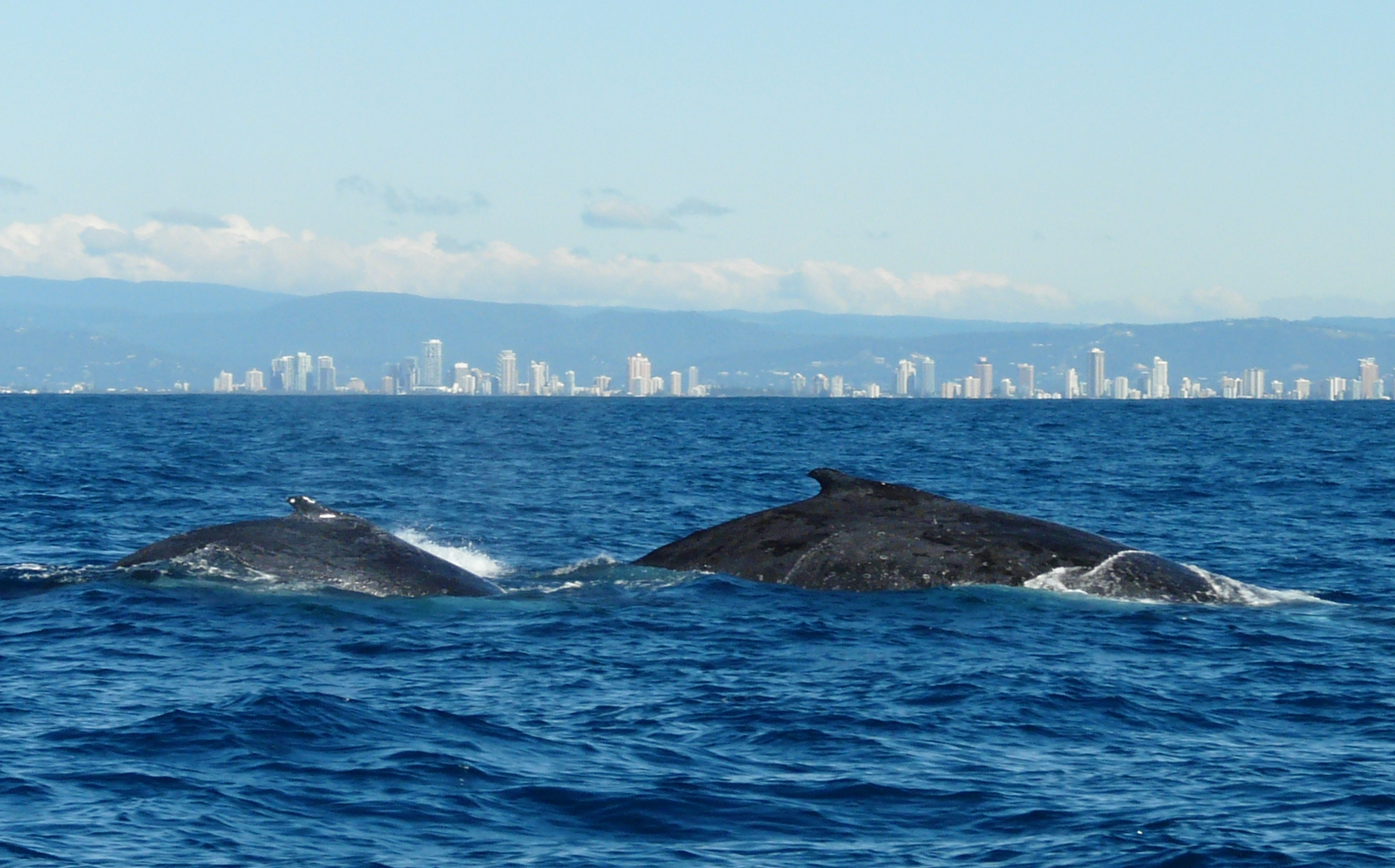
A couple of humpback whales spotted off the Gold Coast, Queensland

In eastern Australia, whale watching occurs in many spots along the Pacific coast. From headlands, whales may often be seen making their migration south. At times, whales even make it into Sydney Harbour. New South Wales National Parks and Wildlife took an active role in 2010 during the peak southern whale watching season between May and November with the launch of its whale watching site. At Cape Solander in the south of Botany Bay community volunteers participate in a long-term scientific study. Each year from the 24 May until the 1 August they count whales swimming past from sunrise to sunset.

The Sunshine Coast and Hervey Bay (where the whales stay and rest before migrating) in Queensland, offer reliable whale watching conditions for southern humpback whales from the end of June through to the end of November each year. Hervey Bay is a particularly good spot for whale watching as the whales are not constantly on the move. Instead they exhibit a range of playful behaviours. Each year in August Hervey Bay hosts the Whale Festival which marks the beginning of the whale watching season and includes various ceremonies such as blessing the fleet.

Whale numbers and activity have increased markedly in recent years. Sydney, Eden, Port Stephens, Narooma and Byron Bay in New South Wales are other popular hot spots for tours from May to November.

=== Migaloo ===
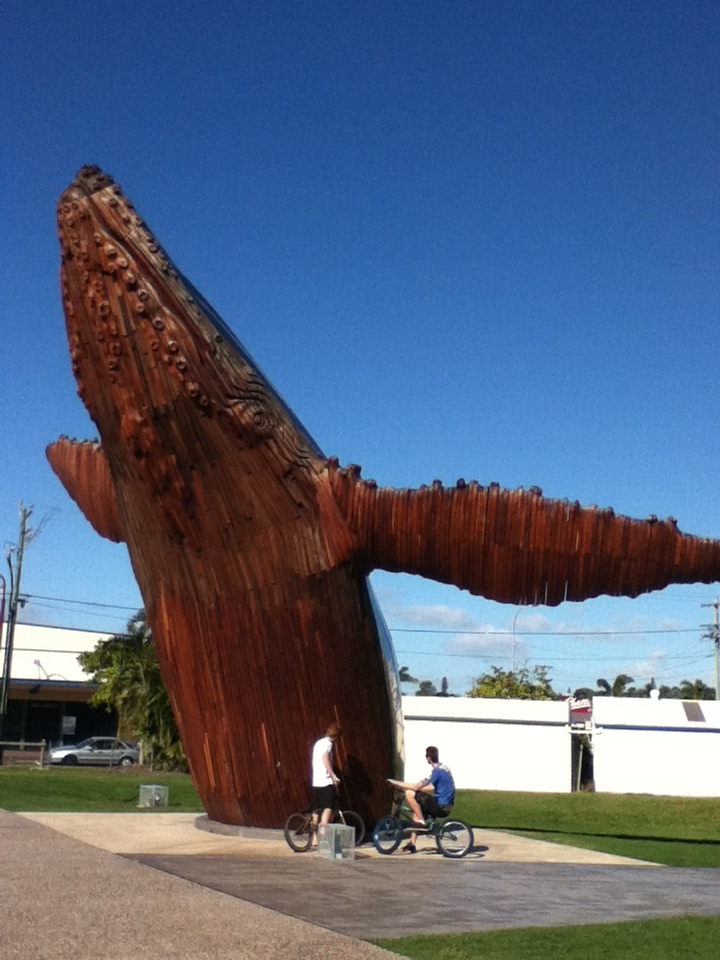
Sculpture at Hervey Bay, 2013

One particular whale, now proven to be a true albino, receives special attention due to its all-white appearance. Migaloo (whose name means "white fella" in multiple Aboriginal languages) was first spotted in 1991 in the waters off Byron Bay. Believed to have been born in 1986, he is considered to be the most famous humpback whale in the world. In 2004, skin samples were taken by researchers interested in the whales genetics. Due to their rarity, Migaloo (and any humpback whales that are greater than 90% white in colour) have "special status" in Queensland and New South Wales; both have laws stipulating that watchers must stay at least 500m away, and there are heavy fines for breaching the law.

== See also ==
- Great Australian Bight Marine Park Whale Sanctuary
- Tourism in Australia
- Whale watching in Sydney
- Whale watching in New Zealand
- Whale watching in Ireland
