= Irish Environmental Network =

Network of environmental NGOs

- Abbreviation: IEN
- Formation: November 2001
- Type: Umbrella network / non-governmental organisation
- Purpose: Support and funding intermediary for national environmental NGOs in Ireland
- Headquarters: MACRO Centre, 1 Green Street, Dublin 7
- Location: Ireland
- Region served: Ireland
- Members: 41 full member organisations
- Main organ: Board of Directors
- Website: www.ien.ie

The Irish Environmental Network (IEN) is a non-governmental network organisation in Ireland, established in November 2001. Its member organisations (41 full members as of 2026, plus a smaller number of associate members) are all environmental charities or friendly societies with a national remit. IEN receives funding from the Irish government and distributes the majority of it to its members, while also channelling shared services, policy coordination, and capacity building across the network. The organisation's legal name is Environmental (Ecological) NGOs Core Funding CLG.

IEN receives core funding from the Department of Climate, Energy and the Environment (DCEE), which it distributes to its member organisations, alongside managing several philanthropically or otherwise externally funded projects, including Fair Seas (marine protected areas), Maréire, and a PEACEPLUS-funded cross-border project.

It works with the Northern Ireland Environment Link, the equivalent body in Northern Ireland, for co-ordination across the island of Ireland.

== History ==
IEN was established in 2001 as an umbrella group to represent and support Ireland's environmental NGO sector, designed to give greater reach and access to funding to disparate, and sometimes small, member organisations. A related but organisationally distinct body, the Environmental Pillar, was formed by many of the same member organisations to act as one of Ireland's recognised social partners, providing a channel for environmental civil society to engage with government on policy at national, regional, and local levels.

== Structure and governance ==
IEN is governed by a board of directors; as of 2024 the chair of the board was Kieran Flood. The organisation is led by a chief executive officer, supported by a small staff team covering finance, operations, membership, and project delivery.

The Environmental Pillar, comprising 36 IEN member organisations as of 2026, operates as the network's lobbying and advocacy arm, presenting members' concerns to government and other social partners on environmental policy matters.

== Funding model ==
IEN's principal role is as a funding intermediary: it receives core funding from DCEE and distributes the majority of it to its member organisations, alongside pursuing and managing project and philanthropic funding on behalf of the sector. Notable examples of this intermediary role include the Fair Seas campaign, where philanthropic funding is channelled through IEN to a coalition of member and partner organisations.

== Projects ==
=== Fair Seas ===
Fair Seas is a coalition campaign, of which IEN is a founding member, seeking to protect, conserve and restore Ireland's marine environment. Launched in 2022, the campaign brings together IEN, the Irish Wildlife Trust, BirdWatch Ireland, the Sustainable Water Network (SWAN), the Irish Whale and Dolphin Group, Coastwatch, and Streamscapes to call for the designation of at least 30% of Ireland's maritime area as effectively managed marine protected areas (MPAs) by 2030, in line with Ireland's international commitments. The campaign is funded by philanthropic bodies including Oceans 5, the Becht Foundation, the Blue Nature Alliance, and the Wyss Foundation. Fair Seas has published research including the 2022 report Revitalising Our Seas, identifying areas of interest for MPA designation, and a legal handbook on Ireland's marine protection framework, and has made submissions to national MPA legislation consultations and Oireachtas committees.

=== Maréire ===
Maréire is IEN's Marine Biodiversity and Offshore Renewable Energy project, run in partnership with the Irish Whale and Dolphin Group and BirdWatch Ireland, and funded by the Department of Climate, Energy and the Environment. The project researches and advocates on the interaction between offshore renewable energy development and marine biodiversity, aiming to ensure environmental protection remains central to planning decisions as Ireland expands offshore wind, tidal and wave energy capacity. Maréire also administers a postgraduate research grant scheme supporting Irish-based master's and PhD students studying the environmental dimensions of offshore renewable energy.

=== CHANGE (PEACEPLUS) ===
CHANGE (Collaborative Horizons for All-Island Nature and Governance Enhancement) is a cross-border project delivered jointly by Northern Ireland Environment Link (NIEL, lead partner) and IEN, funded through the PEACEPLUS programme managed by the Special EU Programmes Body (SEUPB). Awarded €1,800,000 in PEACEPLUS funding, the project brings together environmental NGOs, public bodies, and researchers on both sides of the Irish border to address shared environmental challenges, including climate change, biodiversity loss, freshwater quality and marine protection, and to improve data interoperability and environmental governance following the UK's departure from the EU. PEACEPLUS is co-funded by the European Union, the Government of the United Kingdom, the Government of Ireland, and the Northern Ireland Executive.

== Green News ==
IEN supports Green News (greennews.ie), an online publication covering environmental and climate news in Ireland and internationally.

== Biodiversity Week ==
IEN coordinates Ireland's participation in National Biodiversity Week, an annual celebration of nature during which member organisations host public events across the country. As part of this, IEN has run a biodiversity-themed photography competition; the winning images from one edition were covered by The Irish Times.
