= Whale watching in Ireland =

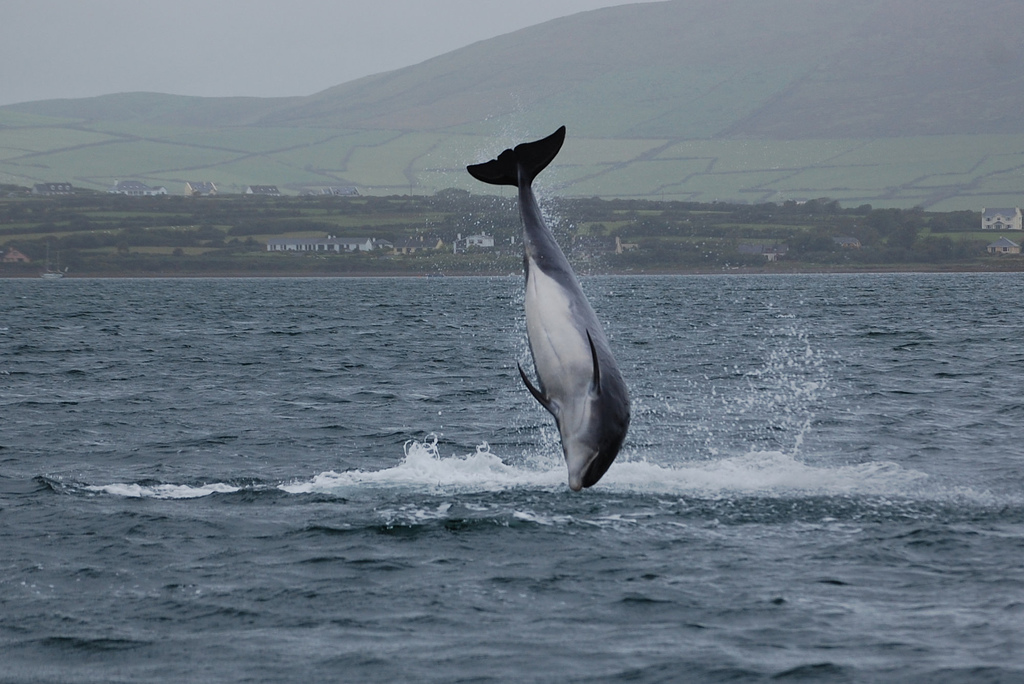
"Fungie", a popular resident bottlenose dolphin

Whale watching in Ireland is a growing tourism activity. The territorial waters of Ireland have been designated a Whale and Dolphin sanctuary since 1991. In total, 25 different cetacean species have been recorded in Irish waters, with large numbers of cetaceans making seasonal passages off the coastline, and a number of resident populations in coastal harbours and transitional regions.

== Background ==
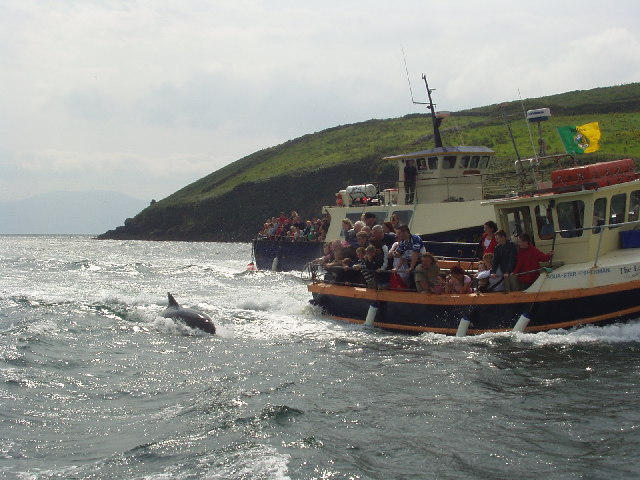
Whale watching in Dingle Bay

Between 1900 and 1925 a whaling operation existed on the west coast of Ireland. Following reduced catch, the operation closed in 1925 for economic reasons. Whaling was banned in Irish waters by the Whale Fisheries Act, 1937, following which whale numbers are believed to have increased, although there is contention over the degree to which this is caused by the cessation of whaling and by global warming.

In 1990, the Irish Whale and Dolphin Group was founded as a conservation charity, and carries out monitoring of whale sightings and strandings, as well as promoting the conservation of cetaceans in Irish waters. They were also monumental in achieving sanctuary status for Irish territorial waters.

Both boat- and land-based whale watching have become an important tourism activity, and are promoted by a number of state tourism agencies. These tours often also offer the opportunity to observe seal and seabird populations.

== Key locations ==
Whale watching can be carried out along the entire coastline of the island, however, the South coast is particularly renowned as a whale watching hotspot. Sightings frequently occur on the coastlines of County Clare, County Kerry, County Cork and County Waterford. In addition, Cork Harbour, Shannon Estuary and Dingle Bay each have resident dolphin populations.

== Species ==
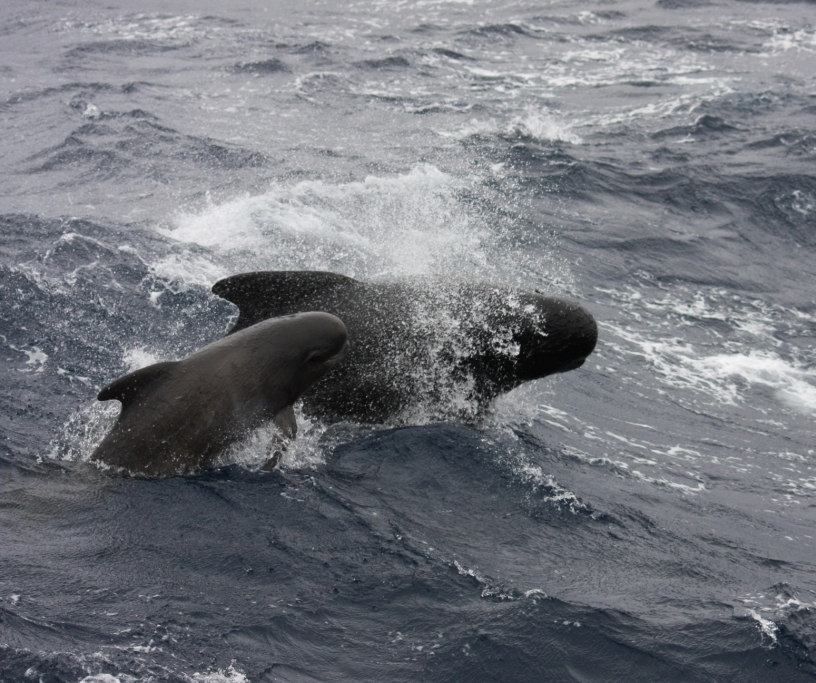
Long-finned pilot whales near the Goban Spur, off the coast of Ireland

In total, 25 species of Cetacea have been recorded in Irish waters. These can be observed off the coast of Ireland throughout the year, but the species present vary with the season.

Spring and Summer see large numbers of Risso's dolphin, minke whale and basking shark. Sunfish and leatherback turtle numbers also peak around this time.

Autumn and Winter are referred to locally as "Big Whale Season", and see the arrival of large baleen whales. Fin whales arrive in late Summer or early Autumn, while humpback whales typically arrive in Autumn, but early Summer arrivals are on the rise. Sei whales are typically seen in the Winter months.

Orca whales have been frequently recorded in Irish waters, however, their seasonal behaviour is unpredictable and they have been known to extend their range in order to follow their food sources. Because of this, they are sometimes seen in very shallow waters, with sightings in Lough Foyle and Cork city. Blue whales, sperm whales and long-finned pilot whales, although known to migrate through Irish waters, typically stay in the deep waters off the edge of the continental shelf, and are more commonly sighted via aerial survey or acoustic methods.

Harbour porpoise, Bottlenose dolphin and Common dolphin are among the most frequently observed species in Irish waters, and are resident throughout the year. A number of permanently resident individual cetaceans, such as Fungie, have been seen to develop a relationship with fishermen and divers, and have received much attention from tourists and the media throughout the years.

== Regulations ==
The Whale Fisheries Act, 1937 banned the hunting of all cetacean species within Irish territorial waters, as well as the hunting of certain whale species outside of Irish waters by Irish-registered ships.

In September 1991, the Irish territory was named Europe's first Whale and Dolphin sanctuary, which was also the first of its kind to encompass the entire territorial waters of a country.

The Natural Habitat Regulations prohibit deliberate disturbance of any cetacean species in Irish waters. The Department of Transport, Tourism and Sport has released measures to be taken by boat operators in order to reduce their anthropological impact on cetacean species.

== See also ==
- Irish Whale and Dolphin Group
- Whale watching in Australia
- Whale watching in New Zealand
- Wild Atlantic Way
