= Fungi (disambiguation) =

Fungi is a plural form of fungus.

Fungi may also refer to:

- Fungi (music), a Caribbean music style
- Fúngi, a Central African food
  - Cou-cou, also known as "fungi", a Caribbean food

== See also ==
- Fungie, a dolphin in Dingle harbour, Ireland
- Fungus (disambiguation)
