= Karin Dubsky =

German-Irish marine ecologist and environmentalist

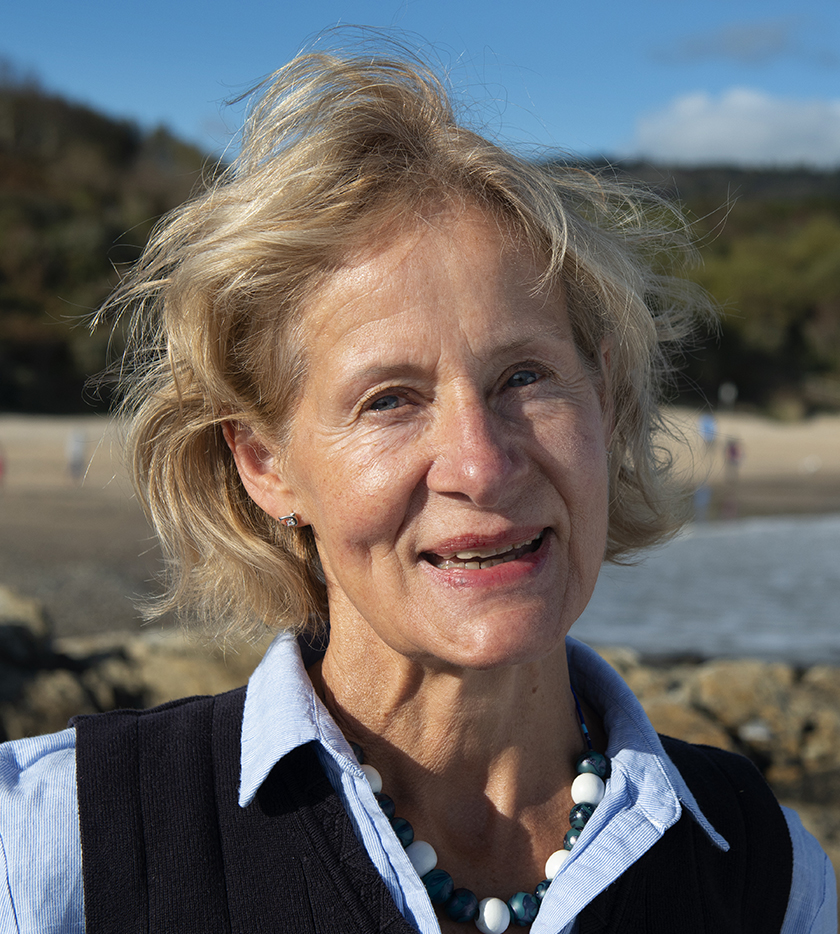
- Born: 1954 (age 71–72); Bonn, Germany
- Education: Trinity College Dublin
- Scientific career
- Fields: Ecology
- Workplaces: Trinity College Dublin

Karin Dubsky (born 1954) is a German-Irish marine ecologist working in Trinity College Dublin, notable as an environmental activist, the coordinator and co-founder of Coastwatch Europe, an environmental NGO and a member of the European Environmental Bureau.

Dubsky was the Green Party candidate for the 2019 Wexford by-election, in which she was not elected.

== Early life and education ==
Dubsky was born in Bonn, Germany, and grew up on a farm straddling Bannow Bay, County Wexford, Ireland. She attended Newtown School, Waterford and then Trinity College Dublin, where she secured a BA in zoology. She then pursued a master's degree in Environmental Sciences, taken partly in University College Galway, completed in Trinity College Dublin.

== Career ==
Dubsky has worked professionally in environmental education, and in research and practical projects, ranging from wetland protection, over waste, oil and litter prevention and control, coastal zone management, environmental law and biodiversity policy.

=== Environmental programs and campaigns ===
Karin Dubsky speaks and campaigns regularly on environmental issues, especially affecting water quality, wetlands, dunes and bathing beaches, in the Irish media. She campaigned for reform of legislation including public information on water quality of bathing beaches, which was introduced in Ireland ahead of other countries.

Dubsky co-designed the Blue Flag for Beaches award programme, co-founded the Irish Clean Air Group, an inter-disciplinary group from TCD and hospitals led by Dr. Luke Clancy, which successfully lobbied for the introduction of smokeless fuel in Ireland, and set up an international volunteer eco-audit of the coast which spread to 23 countries. Data from the survey were used by OSPAR and the EEA. Data from the Coastwatch survey were also used to lobby for a plastic bag tax in Ireland, which, when introduced, was the first in Europe and brought plastic bag litter down from over 54 per km of shoreline to around 3–4.

She co-authored the chapter on public participation and communication in the World Health Organization's Practical Guide to the Design and Implementation of Assessments and Monitoring Programmes for bathing waters.

Dubsky was appointed to the environmental pillar of Ireland's social partnership in May 2009 and is on NESC (The National Economic and Social Council, the Dublin Regional Authority's Dublin Bay Task Force and the Wexford Local Development Board. She was a member of the Eastern Regional Fisheries Board from 2005 to 2010, and Comhar.

=== Other activities ===
Dubsky drew public and official attention to Dublin area raw sewage problems by gaining access to official water monitoring results and organising citizen sewage reports. She further researched treatment options and lobbied for a tertiary treatment plant.

She also acted to halt illegal cockle dredging in Waterford estuary with both media and Senate support.

She exposed wrecking of Kilmuckridge-Tinnaberna Sandhills and together with other Coastwatchers halted the cattle storage and pollution. A restoration order now in place is just being implemented.

In 2014 Dubsky and her husband Paul were refused planning permission to turn part of their home into an "eco-education centre", on the grounds it could cause pollution. In reaching its decision, on an appeal by Dublin-based holiday home owners, the planning board overruled both the local authority and its own inspector, noting the area as being at very high risk from domestic sewage pollution. "The board considered that the proposed development, in close proximity to a stream and to bathing waters, to a proposed drain and to other dwellings, would be prejudicial to public health" it said.

=== Court cases ===
Dubsky took a number of court cases as an individual and as part of Coastwatch. These include a Supreme Court decision that the government must give reasons for opinions (Boyne estuary habitat restoration) and High Court injunctive relief to halt creosote sludge dumping in Waterford Port. Dubsky instigated and persisted with EC complaints which ended in the European Court of Justice and belatedly resulted in improvements to landfill sites, provision of compensatory habitat and restoration of wetlands.

=== Politics ===
She withdrew from the 2011 Seanad election due to an oversight in official registration of her Irish citizenship over forty years previously, which could not be rectified in time for the beginning of the election.

She contested the 2019 Wexford by-election for the Green Party, for the seat left vacant by Mick Wallace after he was elected to the European Parliament, but was not elected.

== Awards and achievements ==
- Designed the Biodiversity and EU enlargement monument, erected in Malahide Castle, 2004
- Drafted the Wexford Wetlands county inventory with Wexford County Council, as the first inventory of its kind in County Wexford.

== Personal life ==
As of 2019, Dubsky lives in Ballymoney, County Wexford, with her husband Paul. They have four children - Stephan, Paul, Eoin and Julia.
