= Irish Wildlife Trust =

Natural conservation charity in Ireland

- Abbreviation: IWT
- Formation: 1979; 47 years ago
- Founder: Éamon de Buitléar
- Type: NGO
- Registration no.: 20010966
- Legal status: Charity
- Headquarters: Coleraine House
- Location: Dublin
- Region served: Republic of Ireland
- CEO: Kieran Flood
- Marine Advocacy Officer: Grace Carr
- Head Finance & Compliance: Rupert Butler
- Communications & Network Officer: Charlotte Salter-Townshend
- Board of directors: Anne Hannan; Lisa O’Mahony; Ronan Carroll; Tim Clabon; Gef Dickson; Eoghan Daltun; Sean Murphy; Jamie Rohu; Sinead Hogan
- Publication: Irish Wildlife
- Affiliations: IEN; EEB
- Funding: Department of Climate, Energy and the Environment
- Website: iwt.ie
- Formerly called: Irish Wildlife Federation

The Irish Wildlife Trust (IWT) has been a nature conservation charity and lobbyist in Ireland since 1979. It was renamed from the Irish Wildlife Federation. The head office is based in Glasnevin, in Dublin. One of the founders of the IWT was well known Irish naturalist Éamon de Buitléar

Similar to the UK based Wildlife Trusts the IWT is made up of local branches and volunteers, with branches in Dublin, Laois/Offaly, Galway, Cork, Waterford, Kerry, Longford/Westmeath and Cavan. However, the IWT sees itself as a single nationwide organisation rather than a federation of smaller, independent organisations though some separate conservation groups have become affiliated with the IWT through common interest such as Groundwork (International Volunteer Conservation Work Camps in National Parks), Bat Conservation Ireland (Umbrella Organisation for Bat Groups around Ireland) and Badgerwatch Ireland (Organisation involved in Badger Conservation, Welfare and Awareness). The IWT is a member of the Irish Environmental Network (IEN) and receives core funding from the Department of Climate, Energy and the Environment through the IEN. The IWT is also a member of the European Environmental Bureau and Sustainable Water Network (SWAN).

The IWT has been involved in a number of high profile campaigns since its foundation from salmon poaching to protection of vulnerable habitats and most recently in opposition in the ‘Heritage Bill’ passed in 2017 which contains provisions to extend the legal hedge cutting and scrub burning season to include times when birds are breeding and nesting.
