= Whale watching in New Zealand =

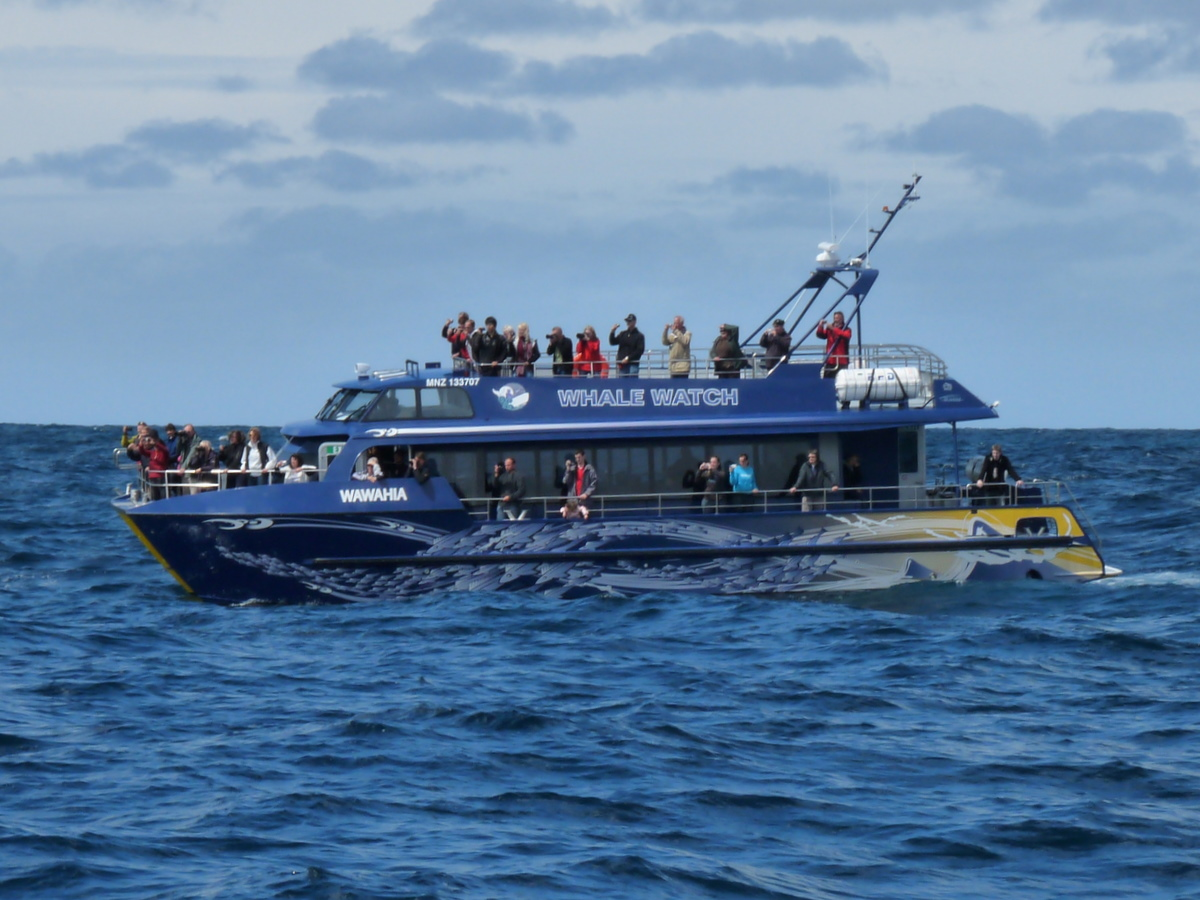
Whale watching in Kaikōura from a boat

Whale watching in New Zealand is predominantly centred around the areas of Kaikōura, Tauranga and the Hauraki Gulf. Kaikōura is a major destination for whale watching tourism in New Zealand, in particular for observing sperm whales which are currently the most abundant of the large whales seen in New Zealand waters. The Hauraki Gulf Marine Park (adjacent to Auckland city) is also a significant whale watching area with a resident population of Bryde's whales commonly viewed alongside other cetaceans including common dolphins, bottlenose dolphins and orca. Whale watching is also offered in other locations, often as eco-tours and in conjunction with dolphin watching. Land-based whale watching is undertaken for scientific purposes from cliffs above Tory Channel, the site of New Zealand's last whaling station that closed in 1964.

== Background ==
Many places that were formerly whaling stations went into recession after the collapse of the whaling industry; New Zealand stopped whaling in 1964. Whaling did not stop due to environmental or ethical concerns but because the declining number of whales made the industry uneconomic. Whilst New Zealand protected right whales in 1935, it was not until 1978 that all marine mammals were protected by law. The Department of Conservation issues permits for marine mammal tourism operations.

== Kaikōura ==
The Kaikōura Canyon is a geologically active submarine canyon located southwest of the Kaikōura Peninsula. The canyon descends into deep water and merges into an ocean channel system that can be traced for hundreds of kilometres across the deep ocean floor. At the head of the canyon, the depth of water is around 30 m (98 ft), but it drops rapidly to 600 m (2,000 ft) and continues down to around 2,000 m (6,600 ft) deep where it meets the Hikurangi Channel. Studies of the Kaikōura Canyon have found that it is a highly productive ecosystem with 10 to 100 times the density of marine life found in other deep sea habitats. Sperm whales can be seen close to the coast, because the deep water of the Kaikōura Canyon is only one kilometre (0.62 mi) off the shoreline to the south of the Kaikōura Peninsula.

The sperm whales seen off the Kaikōura coast are almost entirely sub-adult or adult males. They typically spend around 25% of their time resting on the surface, with the remaining 75% of time spent in deep foraging dives. Male sperm whales are sighted year-round at Kaikōura but individual animals are not truly resident. The Kaikōura region represents only a small portion of the total range of the animals that are seen. A study reported in 2021 examined the records of observations of sperm whales off Kaikōura using photo-identification data collected over 27 years. The analysis showed that although the numbers of sperm whales observed in winter has been relatively constant over the period, there has been a steady decline in the abundance during summer periods.

In addition to sperm whales, humpback whales and southern right whales may be seen off the Kaikōura coast, and rare beaked whales and blue whales have also been seen.

Whale Watch Kaikōura offers marine wildlife tours focussing on sperm whales and other cetaceans, using vessels operating from the marina at South Bay, Kaikōura. The company was originally established as Kaikoura Tours, and was formed by members of the Ngāti Kuri hapū, a sub-tribe of the South Island based Māori iwi Ngāi Tahu. It offered its first whale watching tours in July 1989. By 2009, the company was taking between 90,000 and 100,000 people a year on whale-watching trips, and the business was the largest employer in Kaikōura with over 70 staff during the peak season.

Since 1990, Whale Watch Kaikōura has been the only ecotourism operator with permits for whale watching from a vessel off Kaikōura. The business has been owned and operated by Ngāti Kuri since its establishment in 1989, and has won multiple national and international awards.

Whale watching from the air is also available, and the Kaikoura Aerodrome is mainly used for whale spotting tourist flights.

Whale watching at Kaikōura

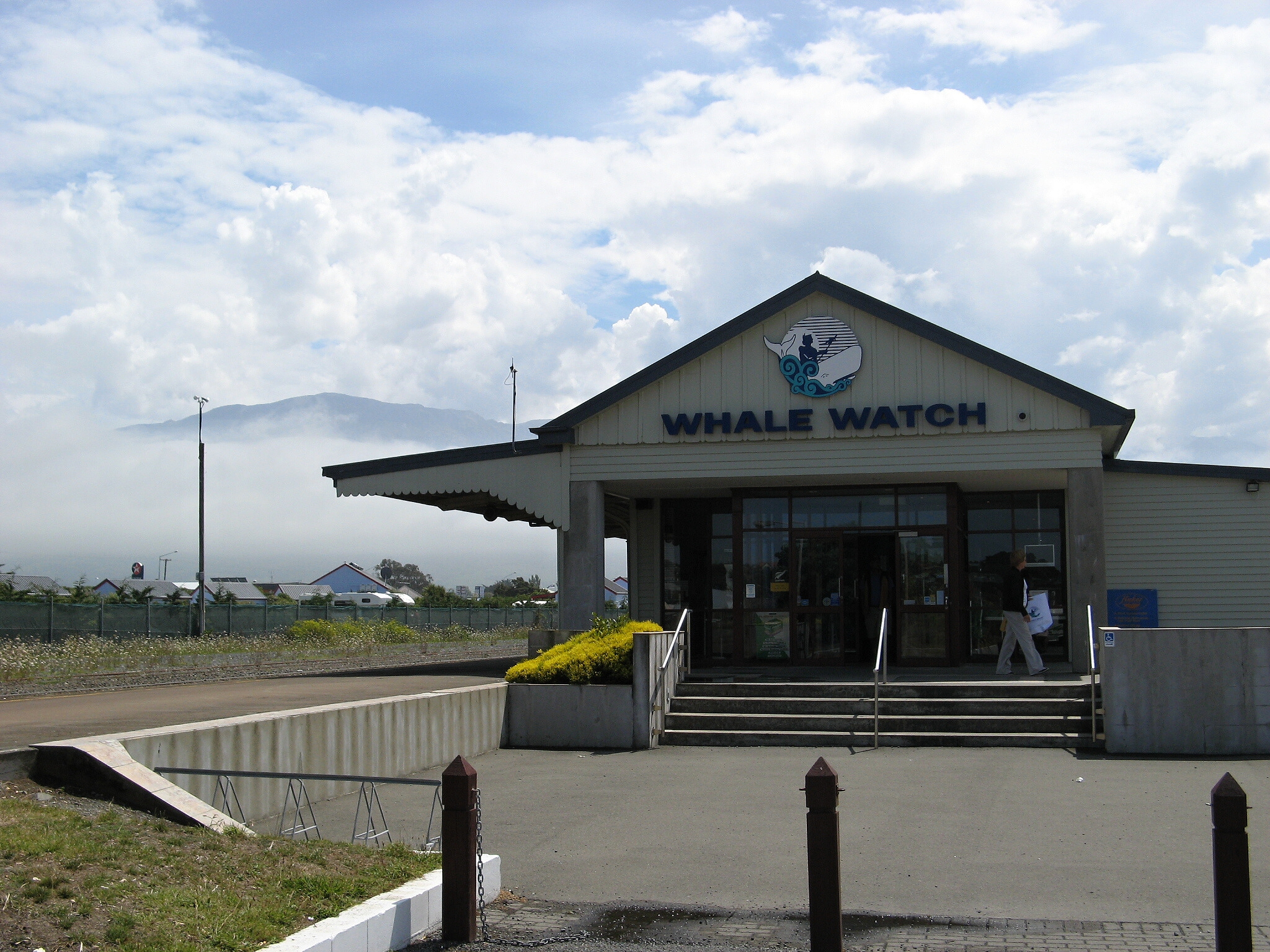
Whale Watch Kaikōura office in the former railway station (2007)

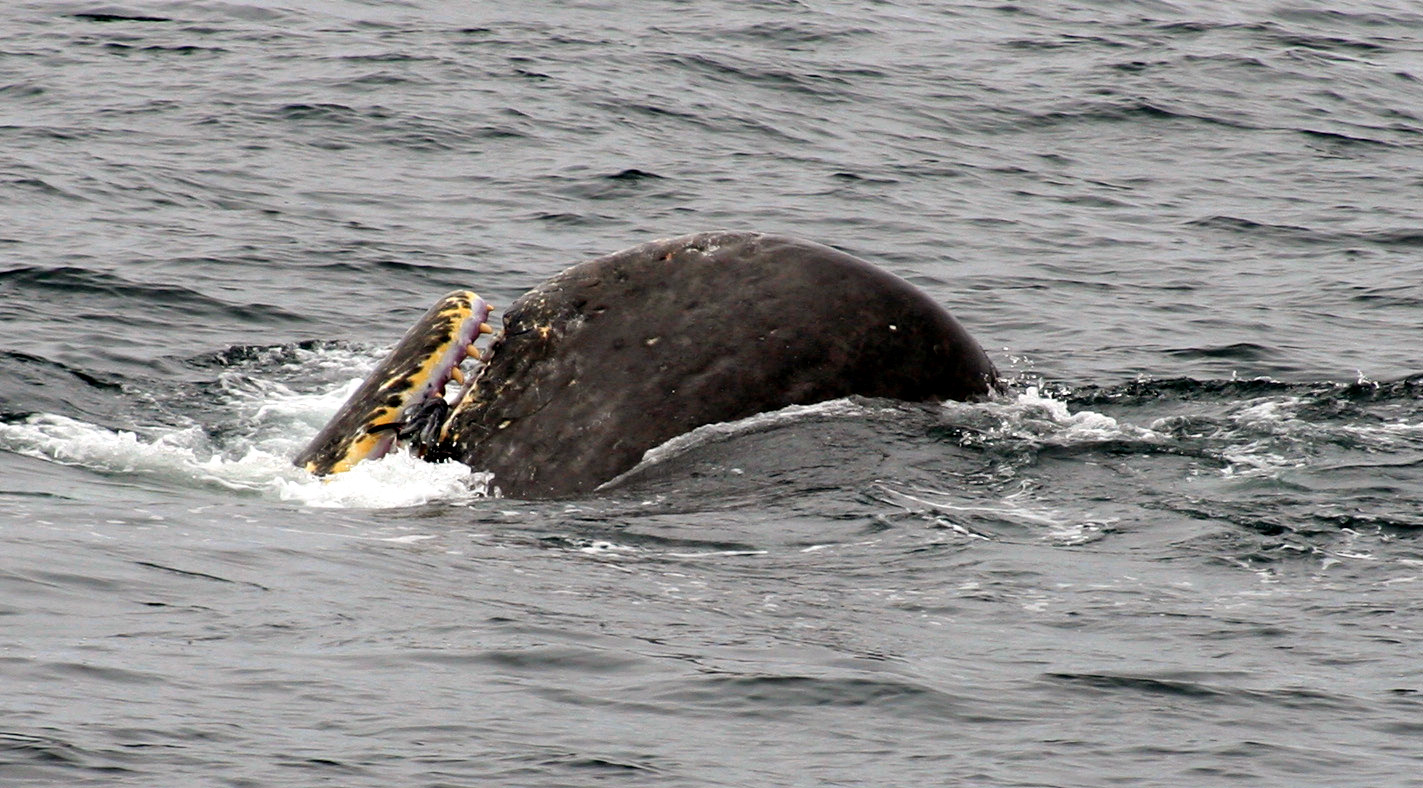
Sperm whale eating a fish off Kaikōura; surface feeding is not common behaviour

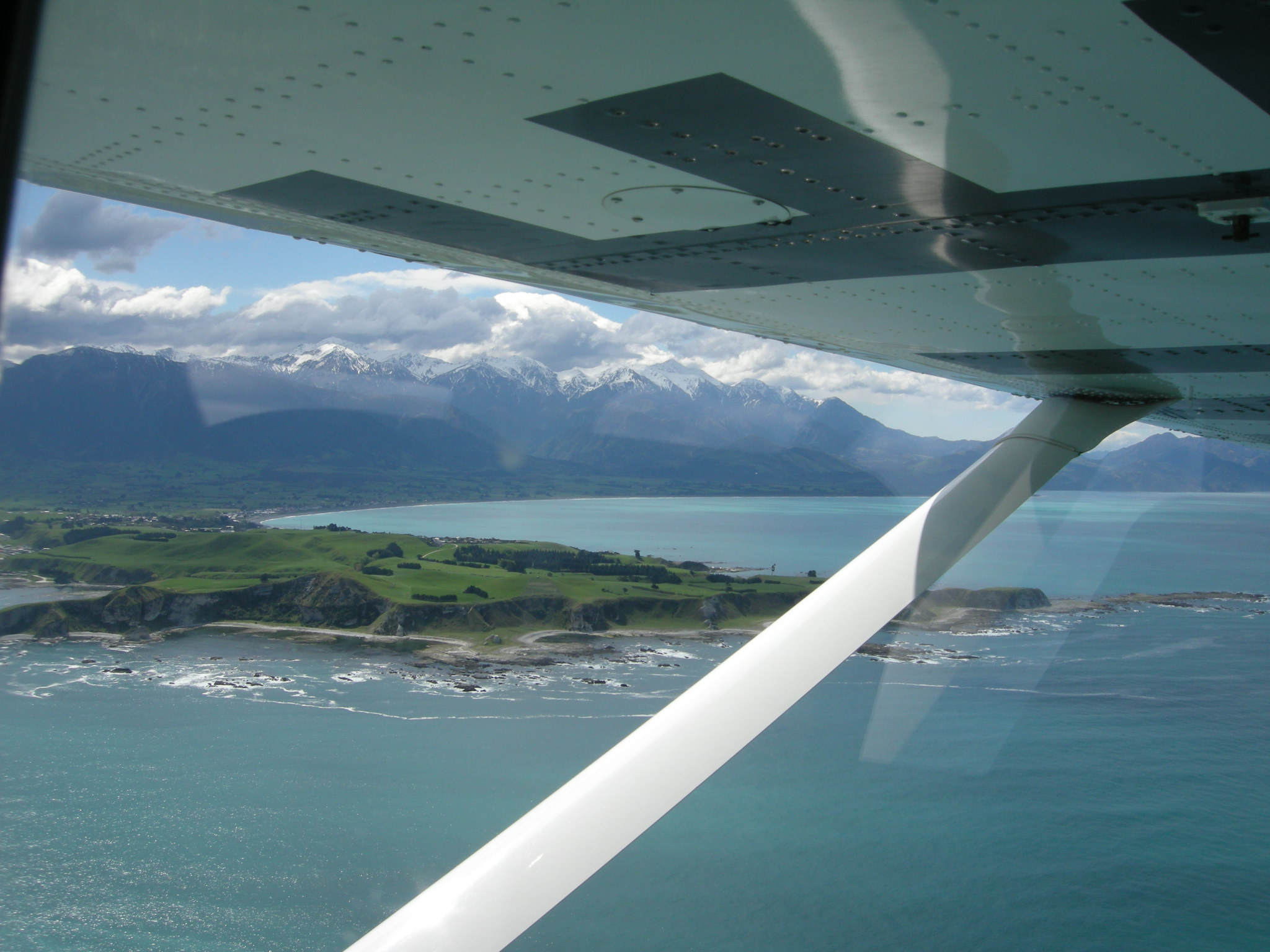
Whale watching by plane, with Kaikōura Peninsula visible in the background

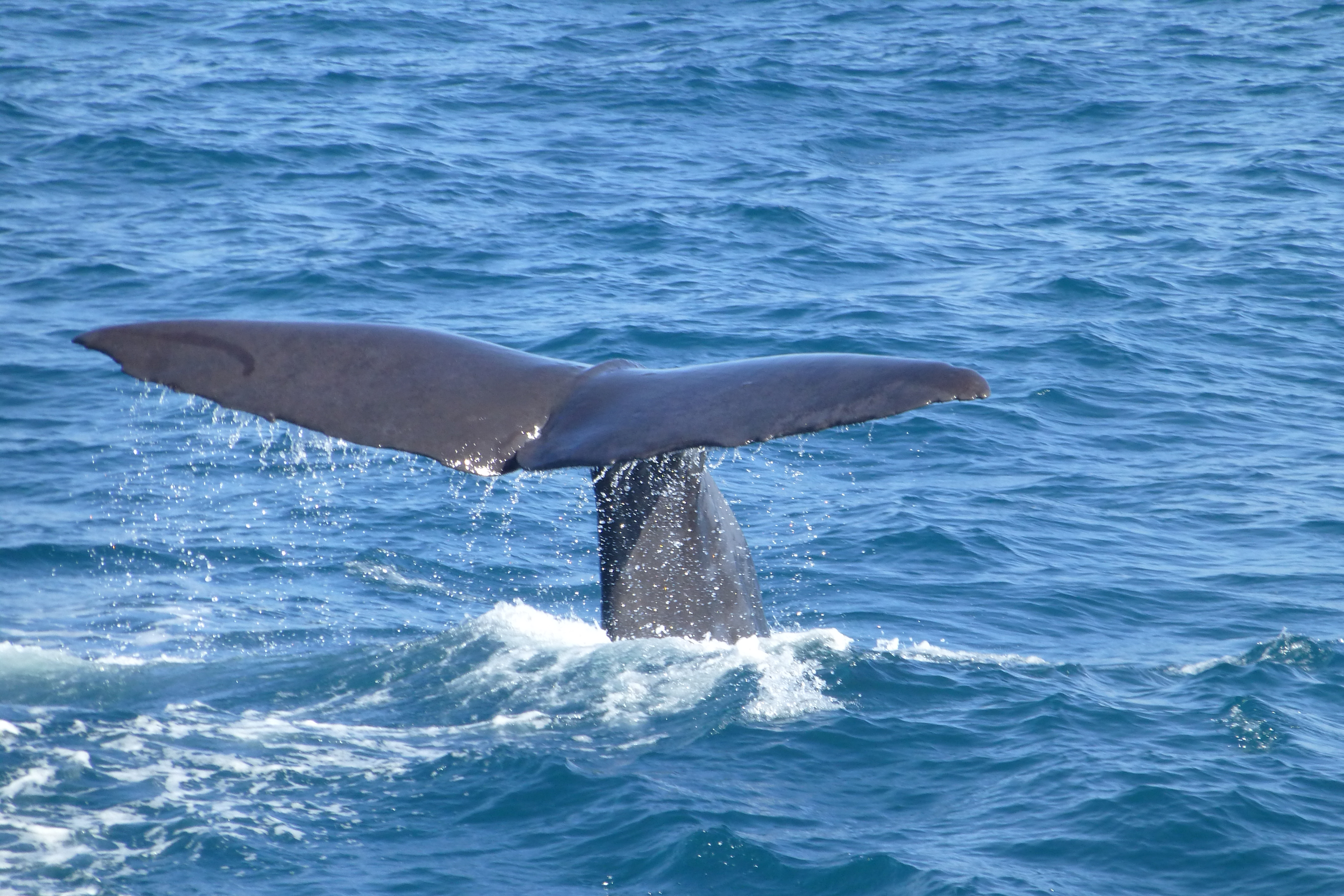
Tail fluke of a sperm whale

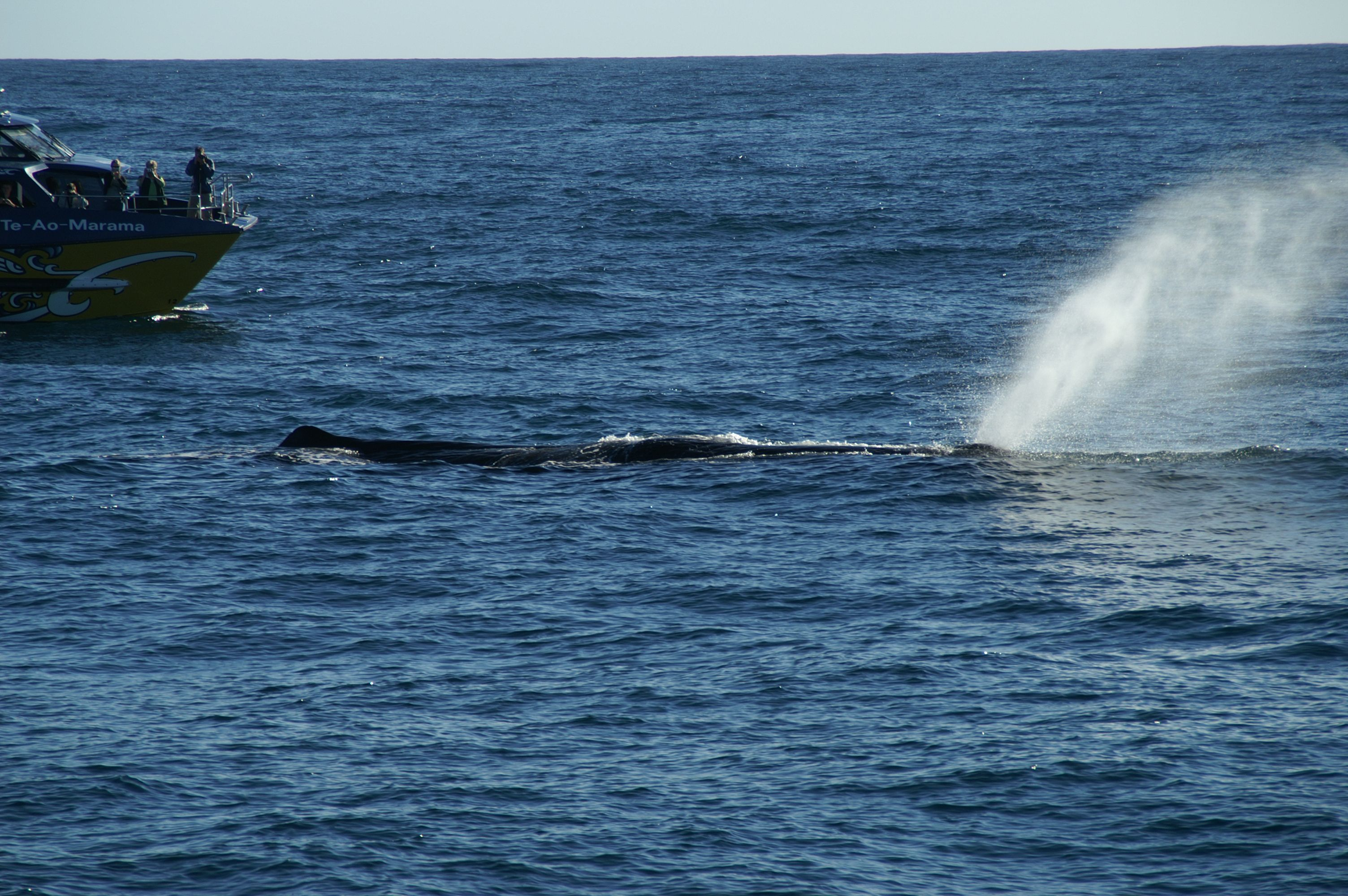
Whale Watch boat and whale

== Tauranga and Mount Maunganui ==
Orca Family pod Tauranga

The Bay of Plenty, including Tauranga and Mount Maunganui, is a marine biodiversity region where whale and dolphin watching is offered. Its coastal waters, harbour, offshore islands and surrounding marine habitats support a diverse range of marine species. Cetaceans recorded in the central Bay of Plenty include common dolphins, bottlenose dolphins, killer whales (orca) and several species of whales. Bottlenose dolphins and orca have also been recorded within Tauranga Harbour. Boat-based whale and dolphin watching and marine wildlife tours operate from Tauranga and Mount Maunganui, providing opportunities to observe marine mammals and other marine wildlife. Sightings in the region have included species such as leatherback turtles, manta rays and whale sharks.

== Hauraki Gulf ==
The Hauraki Gulf is home to several species of cetaceans, most notably Bryde's whales, killer whales (orca), common dolphins and bottlenose dolphins. Situated just off the coast of New Zealand's largest city Auckland, whale watching tours into the Hauraki Gulf Marine Park depart daily (weather permitting) from the Viaduct Harbour.

Whale watching in the Hauraki Gulf

Passengers aboard a whale watching vessel have a close encounter with a Bryde's whale

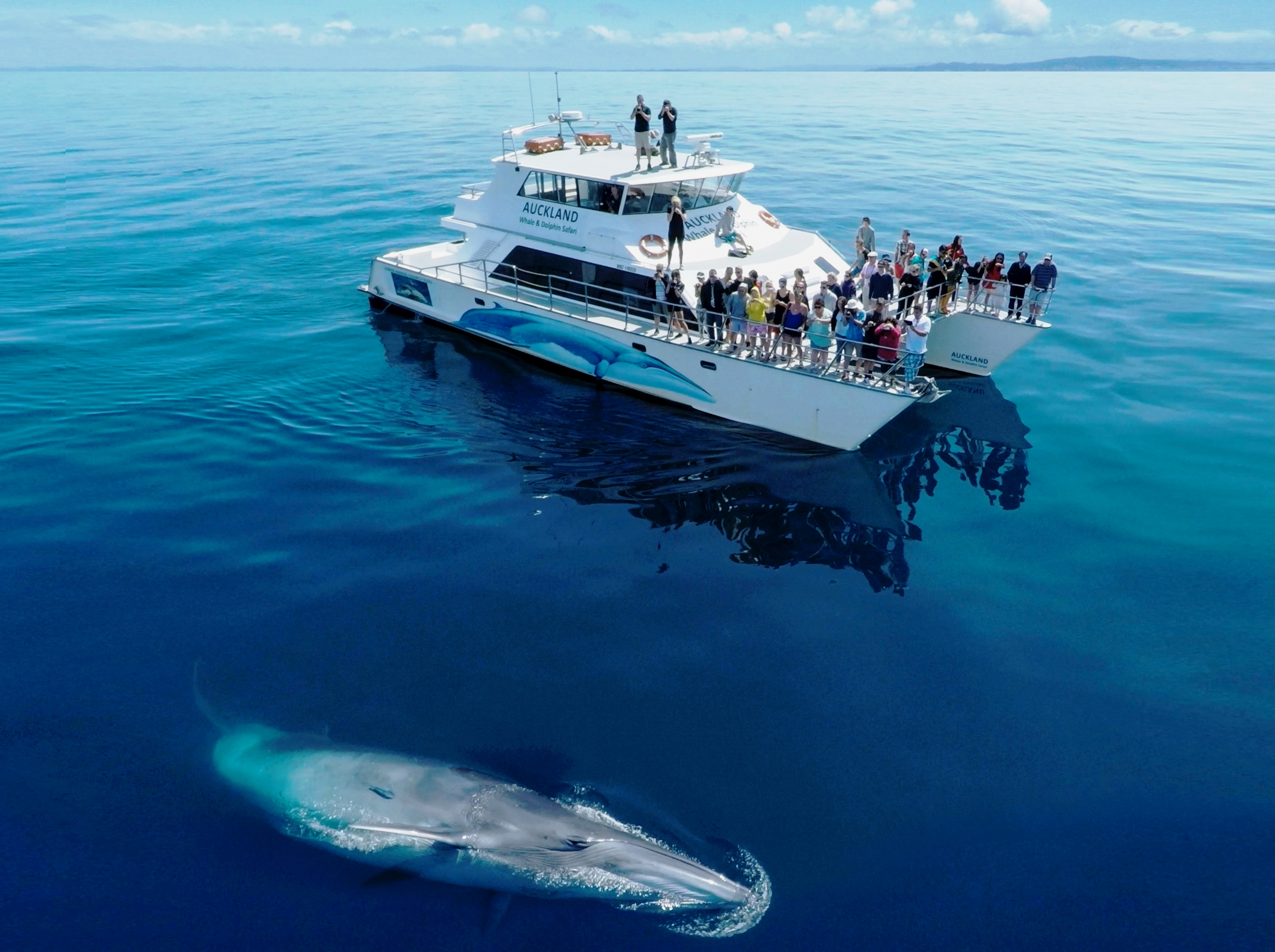
A Bryde's whale viewed from Auckland Whale & Dolphin Safari's vessel the 'Dolphin Explorer'

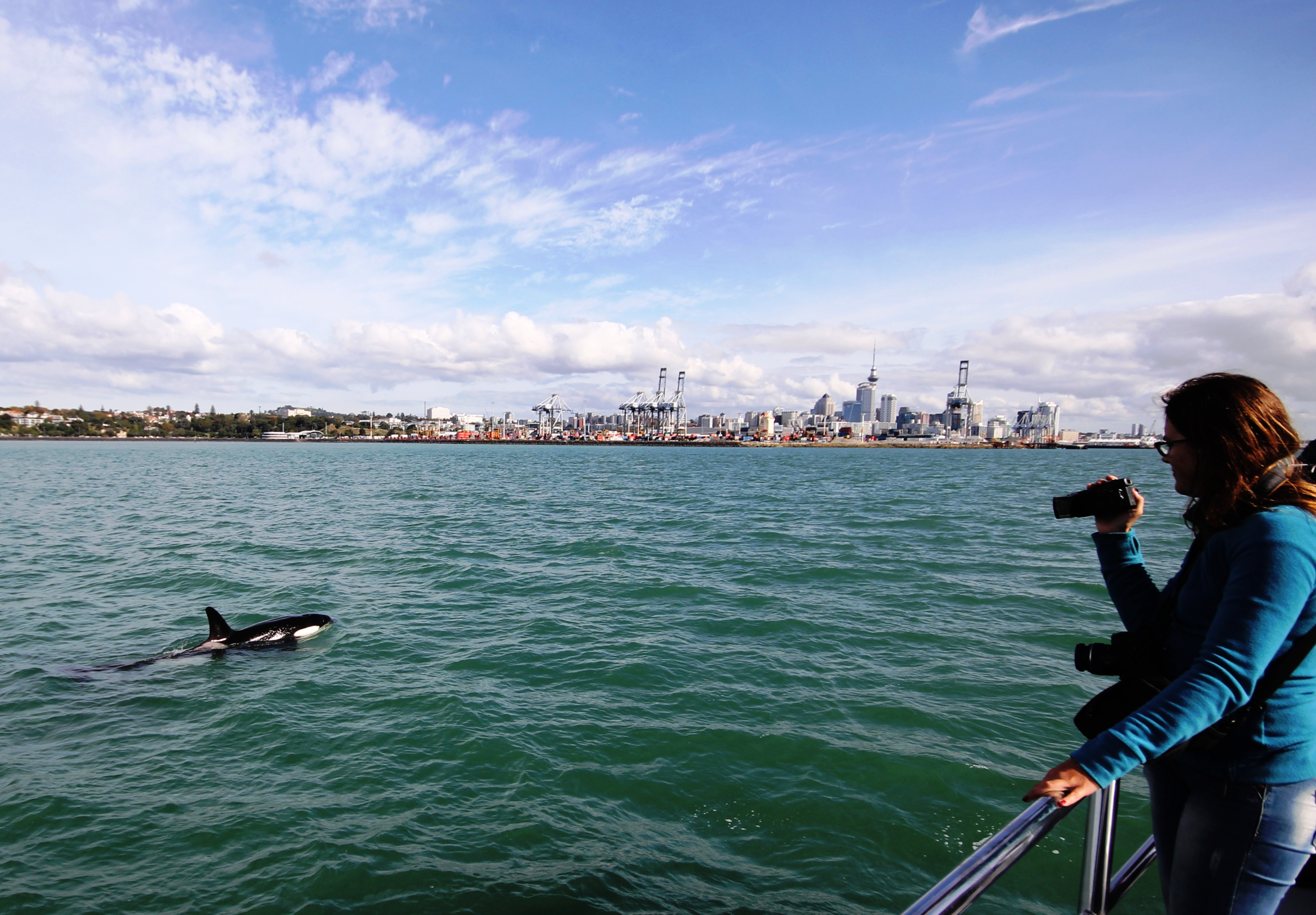
Orca are often seen close to Auckland city

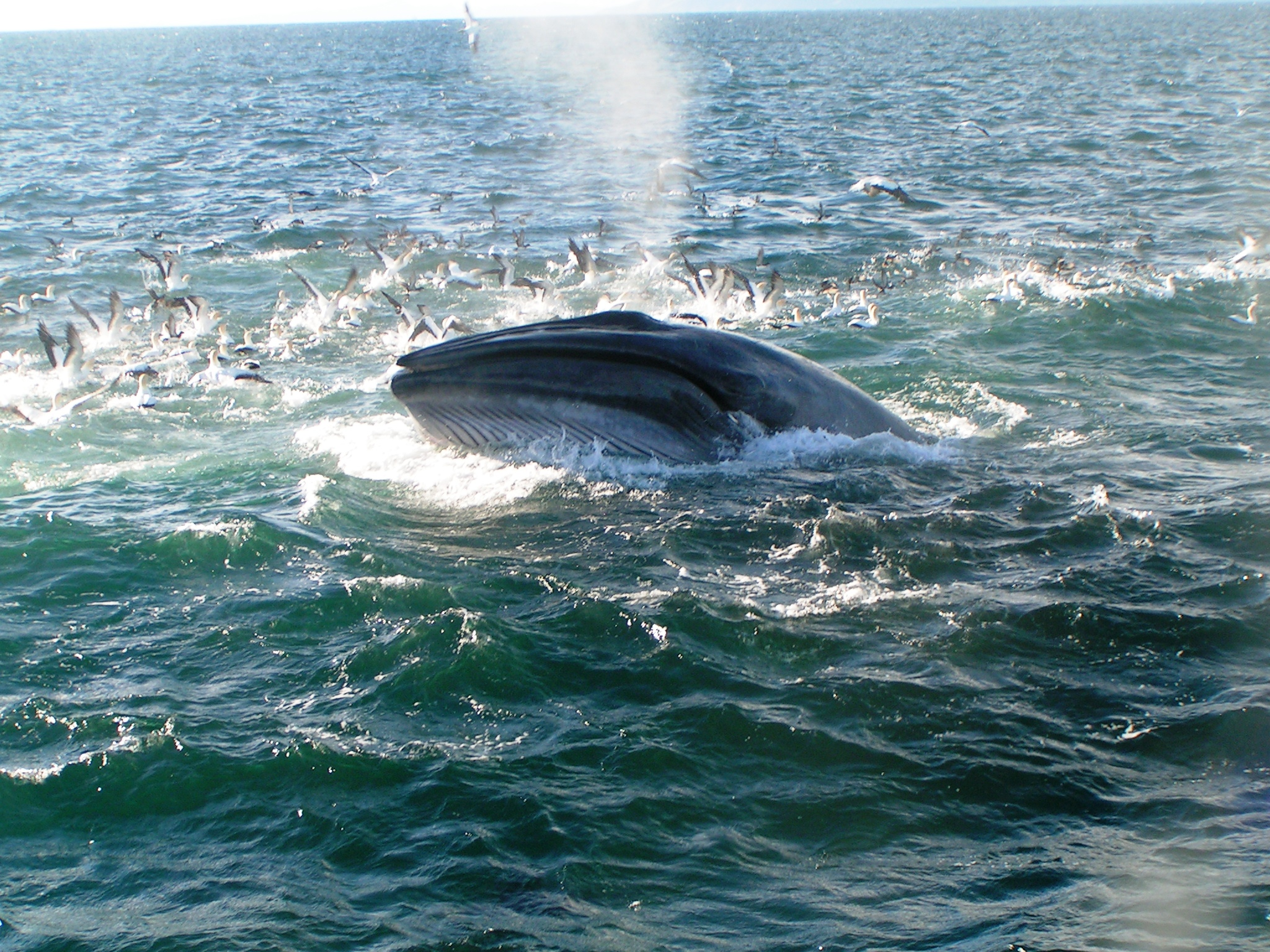
Bryde's Whale

== Tory Channel ==
New Zealand's last whaling station was in Whekenui Bay in Tory Channel in the Marlborough Sounds. It closed in 1964. The high cliffs at the entrance of Tory Channel are ideal for land-based whale watching. During the migratory season for whales, the lookout is staffed and whales passing Cook Strait are watched for research purposes. Most of the volunteers undertaking the work are ex-whalers. It is also the location where the first Southern right whale on main islands sighted since the end of whaling. Cetaceans can be seen in Waikawa, Picton, French Pass, and in Abel Tasman National Park as well.

== Other locations ==
Ingrid Visser's research team filming orcas

Whale watching and dolphin watching is also offered in the Bay of Islands and Moutohora Island (also known as Whale Island) in the Bay of Plenty. Whales have been spotted in Otago Harbour, and in waters above the deep sea canyon off Dunedin. The canyon may be an important feeding ground for toothed whales, especially for Shepherd's beaked whales, and its importance may be comparable to that of the Kaikōura Canyon.

== See also ==
- Whale watching in Australia
- Whale watching in Ireland
