= Fungus (disambiguation) =

A fungus is any member of the group of eukaryotic organisms that includes microorganisms such as yeasts and molds, as well as the more familiar mushrooms.

Fungus may also refer to:

- Fungus (Ninjago), character from Ninjago
- Fungus (XM), defunct radio station
- Fungus Rock, island in Malta

== See also ==
- Fungi (disambiguation)
