= Coastwatch Europe =

Ireland-based environmental group network

Coastwatch Europe is a voluntary organisation which monitors the coastal and wetland environments of several European countries, campaigns for improvements to environmental policies and for the implementation of existing environmental legislation, and organises public information events and seminars. The scope of activities of coastwatch organisations in different countries varies, but all member countries participate in the annual Coastwatch Survey of coastal litter and pollution. The Coastwatch Survey in Ireland provided strong positive feedback in relation to the plastic bag levy within a year of its introduction and the number of plastic bags per kilometer continued to fall to less than 10% of 2001 levels.

Coastwatch Europe's international co-ordinator is Karin Dubsky.

== History ==
Coastwatch Europe began as The Dublin Bay Environment Group, which became the Irish Coastal Environment Group as more national issues were covered by their agenda, and then Coastwatch Europe, as volunteers established networks in other countries to organise participation in the international litter and pollution survey.
