= Irish Whale and Dolphin Group =

Irish non-governmental organisation

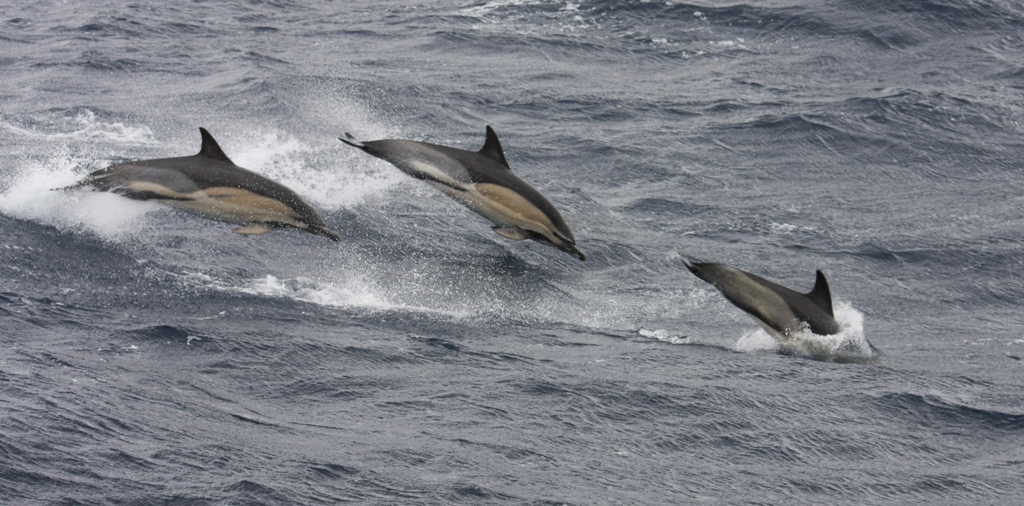
- Common Dolphins in the Goban Spur South of Ireland
- Abbreviation: IWDG
- Formation: December 1990; 35 years ago
- Type: NGO
- Registration no.: 20029913
- Legal status: Charity
- Purpose: Environmental protection and conservation
- Headquarters: Kilrush, County Clare, Ireland
- Region served: Irish territorial waters
- Parent organization: Irish Environmental Network
- Budget: €261,164 (2015)
- Expenses: €248,601 (2015)
- Volunteers: 50-249 (2015)
- Website: iwdg.ie

The Irish Whale and Dolphin Group (IWDG) is a cetacean conservation and outreach organisation based in Ireland. It is the official Irish recording scheme for cetaceans (whales, dolphins and porpoises), as well as sea turtles and basking sharks, tasked and funded by the National Parks and Wildlife Service (NPWS) to record sightings and strandings of these species in Ireland.

== History ==
The IWDG was founded in December 1990 to establish a cetacean stranding and sighting scheme, and to campaign for the establishment of a cetacean sanctuary. In June 1991, the Irish Government responded by declaring Irish Waters to be the first European whale and dolphin sanctuary. The group was granted a charitable status in December 1999.

== Organisation ==
The IWDG is a limited company with charitable status. Its operations are overseen by a board of directors and a number of officers, including Dr. Simon Berrow who, as of 2019, was acting CEO. The charity is a member of, and funded by, the Irish Environmental Network.

== Activities ==
=== Mission Statement ===
The IWDG mission is to promote better understanding of cetaceans & their habitats through education & research. They carry this out by: the collection & distribution of information and collaboration with universities, government & research groups

=== Stranding and sighting scheme ===
One of the main activities carried out by the IWDG is the collection and storing of reported cetacean sightings and strandings in Irish waters. The complete database of reports is disseminated through the IWDG website. The main objective of this scheme was to ensure that cetacean stranding reporting was done in a geographically uniform and objective manner. Part of the scheme involves training a network of local observers through both training workshops and the provision of identification material. In the case of humpback whales, the group maintains a catalogue of fluke identification photos in order to distinguish between individuals.

=== Cetacean welfare ===
The IWDG lists the importance of engaging with external groups and promoting responsible whale watching in its mission statement. To this aim, it has released a document outline guidelines to be followed by groups who may come in contact with live cetaceans, such as fishermen, whale-watching groups and research vessels, in order to better safeguard the wellbeing of the creatures. As part of these guidelines, the group advises against swimming with cetaceans.

=== Cetacean conservation ===
The IWDG has been involved in the collection of biopsy samples from stranded large baleen whales since 2003. They have also applied for a licence to attach tracking tags to fin whales in order to determine their distribution outside of Irish waters.

== Outreach ==
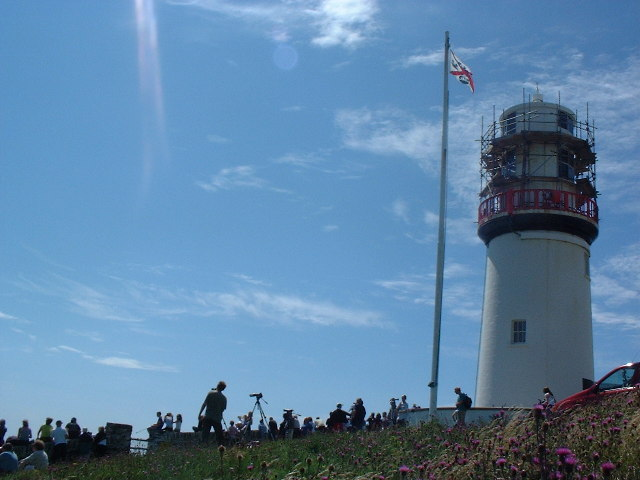
Whale Watch Day at Galley Head Lighthouse, Co. Cork, in August 2004

One of the stated objectives of the IWDG is to promote Ireland's suitability for observing cetaceans. In addition to engaging with the press, the group organises workshops to train members of coastal communities in the identification of cetacean species and reacting to live strandings. As part of these outreach activities, the group organises an annual Whale Watch Day to promote land-based whale watching, with the assistance of volunteers.

== Vessels ==
=== RV Celtic Mist ===
RV Celtic Mist is a 56 ft steel-hulled ketch, donated to the IWDG in 2011 by the Haughey family. The vessel underwent an EU-sponsored refit, before being relaunched in August 2012. It is used for training members in cetacean identification and monitoring, and for research projects, including the use of acoustic survey techniques. On its maiden voyage, the research vessel encountered 11 cetacean species, including blue whales.

=== Other vessels ===
Prior to obtaining use of the RV Celtic Mist, cetacean surveys were carried out by IWDG members onboard the Marine Institute's RV Celtic Voyager and RV Celtic Explorer ships for a number of years.

== See also ==
- Whale watching in Ireland
- Tourism in Ireland
