= Whale watching in Sydney =

Whale watching is a popular pastime in Sydney in the winter and spring. There are a number of different migration and whale seasons.

== Humpback migration ==
The humpback whale migration passing Sydney takes place between April and December each year. The season is split into two distinct sections depending on the direction of travel of the majority of whales at that time.

The migrating population is named the Group 5 Southern Hemisphere humpback whale population or the Australian East coast humpbacks. As distinct from other humpback migration populations that travel along the West Australian and South African coasts.

The distance from the coast of the whales is believed to be based on the movements of the ocean currents, primarily the East Australian Current. The East Australian Current is a strong southerly current that the humpback whales make use of during their southern migration. On the Northern migration the Humpback whales will often use the Inshore Northern current, which is a north flowing counter current to the EAC. The main purpose of the annual humpback migration is to breed.

For either migration the best shore locations to watch the whales are on high points along the coast, cliffs and headlands.

From South to North the best locations are:

- Cape Solander, Kurnell, Botany Bay National Park
- Cape Banks, La Perouse
- Magic Point, Maroubra
- Ben Buckler, Bondi
- South Head Signal Station, South Head
- North head Lookout, North Head National Park
- Long Reef point

Spotting whales from elsewhere including directly off the beaches is quite possible, just less common.

Commercial whale watching tours run daily through the humpback seasons and can be boarded at Darling Harbour, Circular Quay and other wharfs around Sydney Harbour.

=== Northern migration ===
From April to mid August the Humpbacks are heading north to give birth and mate in the waters of the Coral Sea. At this time of year they tend to swim constantly north at 4-5 knots (5–9 km/h) and will have regular surface intervals.

At this time the whales are utilizing the Inshore Northern current to assist them on the way north. This current is usually found only within 3 nautical miles (5.6 km) of the coast, so most of the migrating population will pass within this distance. This is the easiest time for shore based spotters to see the full population of humpback whales passing by the Sydney coast as they head north.

Often on the Northern migration, especially when the currents are strong close to shore, a Humpback pod may enter the harbour for a short time. Normally they will leave again within a few hours and will rarely venture far from the harbour entrance.

==== Typical behavior ====
- Breaching
- Tail slapping
- Lunging

=== Southern migration ===
From mid August to mid December the Humpbacks are heading south to return to the Antarctic feeding ground for the southern hemisphere summer. While they will tend southwards they may swim in any direction for hours at a time, with less consistent surface intervals.

At this time they generally swim slower than on the northern migration and use the East Australian Current to move them south. The EAC tends to begin around the 3-nautical-mile (5.6 km) line and may peak in strength up to 10-20 nautical miles from the coast. This means the Southern Humpback migration can sometimes be very difficult to spot from on shore.

However, during Early October to Mid December the mothers and newborn calves pass south, they tend to swim very close to the shoreline. Often they will stop in protected areas to close to beaches to rest and feed.

==== Typical behavior ====
- Breaching
- Tail slapping
- Spyhops
- Mugging (approaching boats to inspect them)
- Feeding (mothers and calves)

== Southern right season ==
The southern right whale does not migrate in the same pattern as the humpback whales, but during the winter months the southern rights will move along the coastline seeking places to mate and shelter with their newborn calves.

They will enter and remain in bays and harbors for days at a time and then move slowly north or south. While they are not as common as the humpback whales, they will tend to make a greater impact since they are far more visible and do not move away as quickly. In the past they have ventured as far as the Harbour Bridge in Sydney Harbour and into Botany Bay as well as resting meters from the shore line of popular surf beaches.

== Other whales ==
Minke whales, Bryde's whales, false killer whales, killer whales and pilot whales will pass the coast at various times, as well as very rarely blue, fin and sei whales. Sperm whales are present off the coast of Sydney but tend to stay near the edge of the continental shelf over 20 nautical miles (37 km) to sea, so are not often seen close to shore.

== Dolphins ==
Pods of common dolphin and bottlenose dolphins are quite common on the Sydney coastline. They are present throughout the year and can be easily seen from the coast.

== Volunteer stations ==
During the humpback migration there are two whale research and observation stations staffed by volunteers as part of a partnership between Macquarie University and a whale watching company. The volunteer stations are at Cape Solander from late May to early August, for the northern migration annual whale survey, and at North Head from late May to the end of August, as research spotters for vessel whale interactions.
