= Fungie =

Individual dolphin known for sightings in Ireland

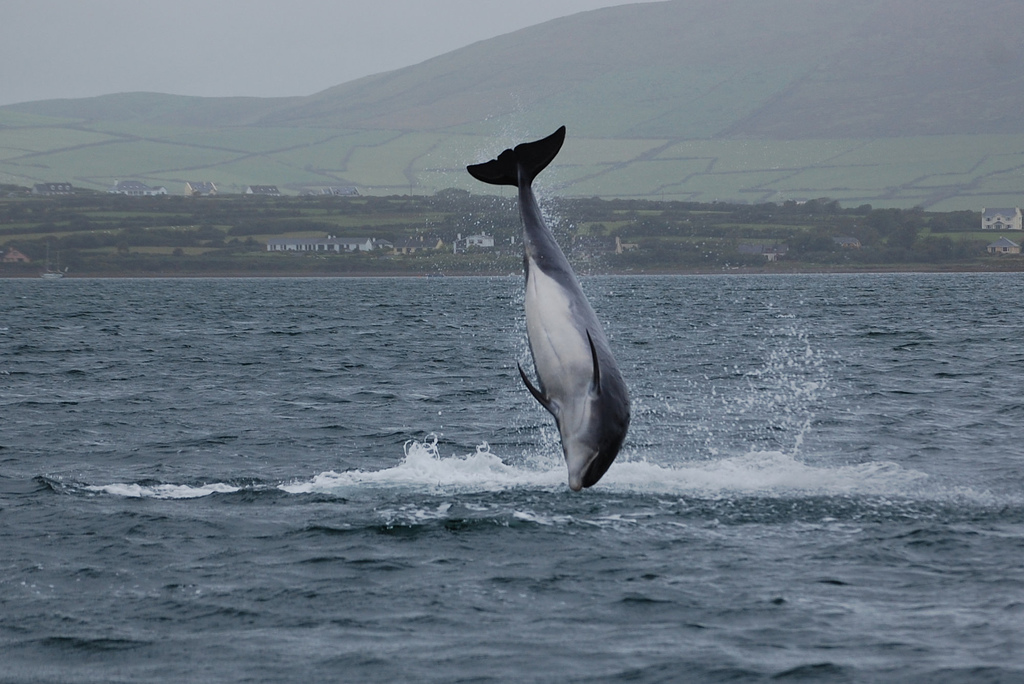
- Fungie in 2007
- Species: Common bottlenose dolphin (Tursiops truncatus)
- Sex: Male
- Born: Before 1980
- Died: October 2020 (presumably) (age 40+)
- Years active: 1983–2020
- Known for: Interaction with humans, long life
- Residence: Dingle harbour and nearby waters
- Weight: 500 lb (230 kg)
- Height: (length) 4 m (13 ft)
- Appearance: Triangular-shaped nick on dorsal fin
- Named after: A local fisherman who was teased for his attempt to grow a beard, who was nicknamed "Fungus"

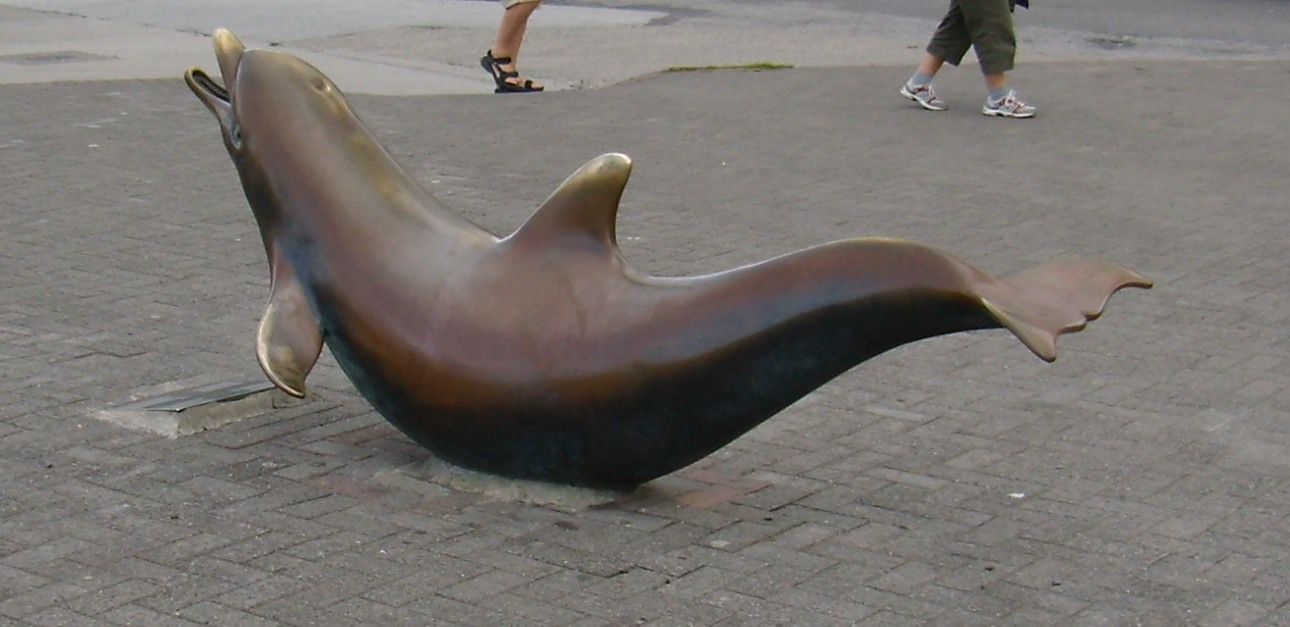
Statue of Fungie outside the Tourist and Information Office in Dingle.

Fungie (/ˈfʌŋɡi/), also known as the Dingle Dolphin, was a male common bottlenose dolphin. He became separated from other wild dolphins and lived in very close contact with the people of Dingle on the southwest coast of Ireland.

Wild bottlenose dolphins are estimated to have a median lifespan between 8.3 and 17.4 years, while one has been observed to live for at least 67 years. Fungie was first seen in Dingle harbour in 1983 and continued to seek out human contact over the following 37 years. Therefore, Fungie was fully grown and likely already in his middle or even old age at the time of his disappearance in October 2020. By 2019, it was estimated that he was at least 40 years of age and Guinness World Records declared him to be the oldest solitary wild dolphin in the world. His long life led to rumours that the original Fungie had died and been replaced with a lookalike to avoid damage to tourism. However, this idea was dismissed by locals, who pointed out that a dolphin introduced to the harbour would simply leave, as it would not be possible to train a newly introduced dolphin to stay within it.

Fungie was known to interact playfully with swimmers, surfers, kayakers, and divers in the water. There were no recorded cases of Fungie being aggressive towards humans. Although it is normal for social animals such as dolphins to live in close contact with each other, it is still a rare occurrence for them to seek out human contact, and Fungie is the first recorded occurrence of a dolphin interacting positively with humans in the wild in Ireland. Fungie had been frequently observed eating garfish, prey not previously known to be eaten by dolphins.

In 2020, there was concern for his welfare after he had gone missing for several days, having last been seen on 13 October. Marine experts have declared that he either moved on to new waters or simply died, and reported sightings by the general public after 15 October were dismissed as "well-intentioned, but incorrect".

== See also ==
- List of individual cetaceans
