= List of British Isles species extinct in the Holocene =

Map of the British Isles

This is a list of wild British Isles species extinct in the Holocene that covers extinctions from the Holocene epoch, a geologic epoch that began about 11,650 years before present (about 9700 BCE) (Note: The source gives "11,700 calendar yr b2k (before CE 2000)". But "BP" means "before CE 1950". Therefore, the Holocene began 11,650 BP. Doing the math, that is c. 9700 BCE.) and continues to the present day. The British Isles includes the islands of Great Britain and Ireland.

During much of the Neogene and Pleistocene, the British Isles were connected to mainland Europe by a land bridge called Doggerland. Changing glacial and interglacial climates repeatedly altered which species could survive there. The climate began to warm again around 9700 BCE, entering the present climatic period known as the Holocene. Animals repopulated Britain and Ireland. Rising sea levels after the end of the Last Glacial Period helped isolate Britain from mainland Europe, and Great Britain was finally cut off from the continent around 6225–6170 BCE, when the Storegga Slide tsunami flooded Doggerland.

In the early Holocene, warming temperatures and rising sea levels reduced or eliminated habitats used by some cold-adapted species. Later losses were attributed to humans, including hunting, habitat destruction, and the introduction of non-native species. Because Britain and Ireland are islands, depleted populations were less able to recolonize once they disappeared.

This list includes both globally extinct species (noted with †) and locally extinct (extirpated) species. Some species have gone extinct several times and then recolonized. The date given is of the most recent extinction. Species that have been reintroduced by humans are noted.

== Mammals ==
Common name	Species	Order	Extinction/extirpation date	Notes
Reindeer	Rangifer tarandus	Artiodactyla	c. 9,000 BCE	Extirpated in Ireland c. 7500 BCE. Reindeer were re-established in 1952; approximately 150–170 reindeer live around the Cairngorms region in Scotland.
Wolverine	Gulo gulo	Carnivora	c. 9,000 BCE	
Arctic lemming	Dicrostonyx torquatus	Rodentia	c. 8,000 BCE	
Steppe lemming	Lagurus lagurus	Rodentia	c. 8,000 BCE	
Narrow-headed vole	Microtus gregalis	Rodentia	c. 8,000 BCE	
Steppe pika	Ochotona pusilla	Lagomorpha	c. 8,000 BCE	
Arctic fox	Vulpes lagopus	Carnivora	c. 8,000 BCE	
Wild horse	Equus ferus ferus	Perissodactyla	c. 8,000 BCE	Re-established proxy in the form of free-roaming domestic horses Set up by the Wildwood Trust, Konik horses have been established across many reserves as a proxy for the extinct tarpan.
Eurasian elk (moose)	Alces alces	Artiodactyla	c. 3,600 BCE	In 2008, Eurasian elk were released into a fenced reserve on the Alladale Estate in the Highlands of Scotland.
Tundra vole	Microtus oeconomus	Rodentia	c. 1,500 BCE	
†Aurochs	Bos primigenius primigenius	Artiodactyla	c. 1,000 BCE	Select breeds of free-roaming domestic cattle are used as an ecological proxy as part of some conservation grazing initiatives.
Walrus	Odobenus rosmarus	Carnivora	c. 1,000 BCE	Extirpated as a breeder; occasional vagrant
Brown bear	Ursus arctos	Carnivora	c. 500 CE	c. 1000 – 500 BCE in Ireland; see Bears in Ireland There have been calls for the reintroduction of the Eurasian lynx, brown bear and grey wolf to the UK, because no large predators are living in viable populations in Great Britain. It is theorized that a large predators presence could create a trophic cascade, thus improving the ecosystem.
Eurasian lynx	Lynx lynx	Carnivora	c. 700 CE or c. 1760	Subfossil evidence suggests an early medieval extinction, but a written record indicates persistence in Scotland into the late 18th century.
Wild boar	Sus scrofa	Artiodactyla	c. 1400	Reintroduced to Britain, extirpated from Ireland. In 1998, MAFF, now known as DEFRA released a report concerning the presence of two populations of wild boar living freely in the UK. These boar are thought to have escaped from wildlife parks, zoos and from farms where they are farmed for their meat, and gone on to establish breeding populations.
Eurasian beaver	Castor fiber	Rodentia: Castoridae	1526	Reintroduced to Britain; never known to have lived in Ireland European beavers have been reintroduced to parts of Scotland, and there are plans to bring them back to other parts of Britain. A five-year trial reintroduction at Knapdale in Argyll started in 2009 and concluded in 2014. A few beavers live wild in the Tay river basin, as a result of escapes from a wildlife park. A similar reintroduction trial is being undertaken on the river otter in Devon, England. Also, around the country, beavers have been introduced into fenced reserves for many reasons including flood prevention. In 2016, beavers were recognised as a British native species, and will be protected under law.
Grey wolf	Canis lupus	Carnivora	1786	1166 in Wales, 1390 in England, 1680 in Scotland/Britain, 1786 in Ireland; see Wolves in Great Britain and Wolves in Ireland
Greater mouse-eared bat	Myotis myotis	Chiroptera	1990	A solitary male was recorded at a single hibernation site in Sussex from 2002 to 2022. In 2023 two individuals were recorded in Sussex. Species is effectively extirpated, with no maternity sites found in the UK.

The European bison (Bison bonasus) is not conclusively recorded from the British Isles during the Holocene. Three female bison were introduced to the West Blean and Thornden Woods in Kent, England on 18 July 2022. A calf, also female, was unexpectedly born in September 2022 and in December 2022 a bull was introduced. These five bison are first "complete" wild herd in the UK in thousands of years. As of October 2024, the herd consists of three females, a bull and four calves.

== Birds ==
Common name	Species	Order	Extinction/extirpation date	Notes
Common crane	Grus grus	Gruiformes	Late medieval period	Re-established
Corn crake	Crex crex	Gruiformes	20th century	Extirpated in most of England and Wales, clings on in the Scottish Highlands and western Ireland. Ongoing reintroduction projects into parts of England and Scotland.
Dalmatian pelican	Pelecanus crispus	Pelecaniformes	c. 3,000 BCE	
Gadfly petrel	Pterodroma sp.	Procellariiformes	Unknown Pterodroma species, presumed Fea's petrel) – Iron Age	
Eurasian spoonbill	Platalea leucorodia	Pelecaniformes	17th century (as a breeding bird)	Re-established
†Great auk	Pinguinus impennis	Charadriiformes	1844	
Great bustard	Otis tarda	Otidiformes	19th century	Reintroduced. Ongoing projects on Salisbury Plain.
Kentish plover	Anarhynchus alexandrinus	Charadriiformes	20th century (last breeding record 1979)	
Little egret	Egretta garzetta	Pelecaniformes	Late medieval period	Re-established
Pied avocet	Recurvirostra avosetta	Charadriiformes	19th century	Re-established
Red-backed shrike	Lanius collurio	Passeriformes	1989 (as a regular breeding bird)	
Western capercaillie	Tetrao urogallus	Galliformes	1780s	Reintroduced
White stork	Ciconia ciconia	Ciconiiformes	1416	Reintroduced. Around 20 white storks pass through the UK each year. A colony at the Knepp Wildland in West Sussex hopes to reinforce these off-path migrants by introducing adults into a fenced reserve, where the juveniles born will be able to establish other colonies further afield. Similar projects are occurring in Derbyshire, by Celtic Rewilding, and Devon
Eurasian wryneck	Jynx torquilla	Piciformes	As a regular breeding bird	
White-tailed eagle	Haliaeetus albicilla	Accipitriformes	1916	Reintroduction projects underway. Successfully re-established on the western coast of Scotland.
Western marsh harrier	Circus aeruginosus	Accipitriformes	Late 19th century	Re-established
Eurasian goshawk	Astur gentilis	Accipitriformes	Late 19th century	Re-established
Red kite	Milvus milvus	Accipitriformes	1870s (England), 1886 (Scotland)	Reintroduced. Having clung on in parts of Wales, red kites have been successfully re-established in parts of England and Scotland.
Osprey	Pandion haliaetus	Accipitriformes	1916	Re-established
Eurasian eagle-owl	Bubo bubo	Strigiformes	c. 8,000 BCE	Re-established

== Reptiles ==
Established in 2020, Celtic Rewilding, aims to reintroduce the lost species of reptile and amphibian that once inhabited Britain, back to rewilding projects. These include the moor frog, European tree frog, agile frog and European pond turtle. They have already had significant success breeding the moor frog in captivity. The organisation also wants to see European pond turtles re-established within wetland restoration projects.

Common name	Species	Order	Extinction/extirpation date	Notes
European pond turtle	Emys orbicularis	Testudines	≤ 3000 BCE	Currently being reintroduced by Celtic Rewilding

== Amphibians ==
Common name	Species	Order	Extinction/extirpation date	Notes
Agile frog	Rana dalmatina	Anura	c. <1800	Present on Jersey. The species likely became extinct due to deforestation.
Moor frog	Rana arvalis	Anura	c. <1800	The species likely perished due to a combination of peat-digging (for fuel) and wetland drainage.
Pool frog	Pelophylax lessonae	Anura	1999	Reintroduced The northern clade of the pool frog was reintroduced from Swedish stock in 2005, to a single site in Norfolk, England, following detailed research to prove that it had been native before its extinction around 1993.
European tree frog	Hyla arborea	Anura		There have been calls for the return of the European tree frog to the wild.

== Fish ==
- Burbot – A fisherman caught the last recorded burbot in September 1969 from the Old West River (Great Ouse), near Aldreth, Cambridgeshire. The species was then presumed extirpated.
- †Orkney charr – last reported in 1908 and declared extinct in the IUCN Red List in 2024

== Insects ==
=== Beetles ===
- Agonum sahlbergi (ground beetle) – 1914
- Platycerus caraboides (blue stag beetle) – 19th century
- Graphoderus bilineatus (water beetle) – 1906
- Harpalus honestus (ground beetle) – 1905
- Copris lunaris (horned dung beetle) – 1974
- Ochthebius aeneus (water beetle) – 1913
- Platydema violaceum (tenebrionid) – 1957
- Rhantus aberratus (water beetle) – 1904
- Scybalicus oblongiusculus (ground beetle) – 1926
- Teretrius fabricii (histerid) – 1907

=== Bees, wasps and ants ===
- Andrena polita (mining bee) – 1934
- Bombus pomorum (apple bumblebee) – 1864
- Bombus cullumanus (Cullum's bumblebee) – 1941
- Eucera tuberculata (mining bee) – 1941
- Halictus maculatus (mining bee) – 1930
- Mellinus crabroneus (digger wasp) – c. 1950
- Odynerus reniformis (mason wasp) – 1915
- Odynerus simillimus (mason wasp) – 1905
- Bombus subterraneus (short-haired bumblebee) – 1989

=== Flies ===
- Poecilobothrus majesticus – after 1907

=== Butterflies and moths ===
General reference: Waring et al., 2009.

- Aporia crataegi, black-veined white – 1925
- Borkhausenia minutella – 1950
- Lithophane furcifera, conformist (moth)
- Euclemensia woodiella (moth) – 1829
- Flame brocade (moth) – 1919
- Frosted yellow (moth) – 1914
- Gypsy moth – 1907; reappeared 1995
- Isle of Wight wave (moth) – 1931
- Large copper – 1865
- Large tortoiseshell – 1960s (recolonising from 2019)
- Many-lined (moth) – 1875
- Mazarine blue – 1906
- Orache moth – 1915
- Reed tussock (moth) – 1875
- Scarce black arches (moth) – 1898 (transitory resident)
- Speckled beauty (moth) – 1898
- Union rustic (moth) – 1919
- Viper's bugloss (moth) – 1969
- The large blue butterfly has been successfully re-established from Swedish stock at several sites, but very few of these are open-access.

=== Dragonflies and damselflies ===
- Norfolk damselfly – 1957
- Orange-spotted emerald (dragonfly) – 1957

=== Caddisflies ===
- Hydropsyche bulgaromanorum (caddis fly) – 1926
- Hydropsyche exocellata (caddis fly) – 1901

=== Cicada ===
- Cicadetta montana (New Forest cicada) – not seen in Britain since 2000.

== Arachnids ==
- Gibbaranea bituberculata — 1954
- Hypsosinga heri — 1912
- Mastigusa arietina — 1926

== Crustaceans ==
- Artemia salina (brine shrimp) – after 1758

== Molluscs ==
=== Land snails ===
- Fruticicola fruticum
- Cernuella neglecta

== Plants ==
The following are plant species which are or have been held to be at least nationally extinct in Britain and Ireland, since Britain was cut off from the European continent, including any which have been reintroduced or reestablished, not including regional extirpations. Many of these species persist in other countries.

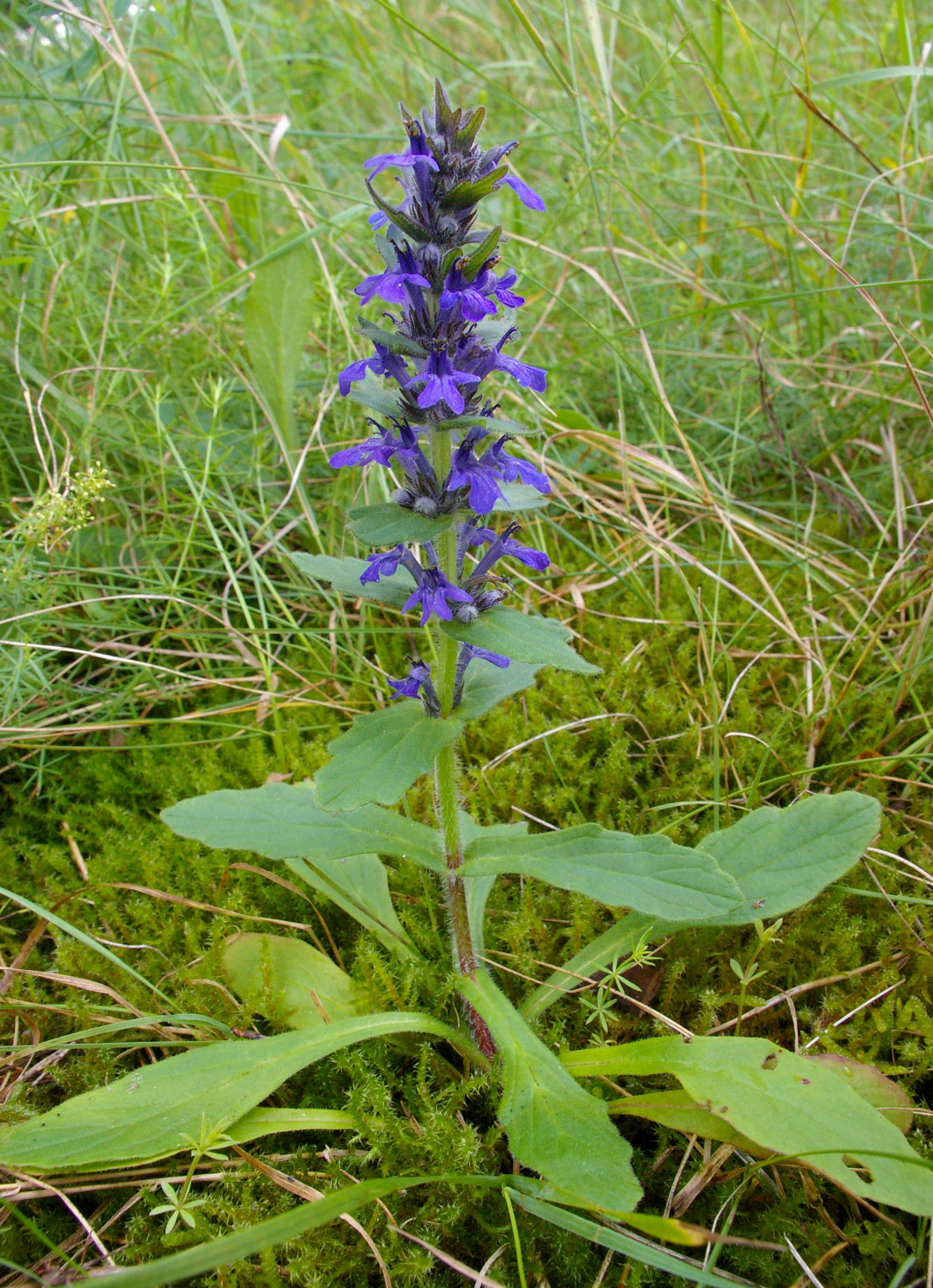
Ajuga genevensis in Germany in 2007. This species is extinct across the whole of the British Isles.

- Adonis annua, pheasant's eye (extinct in Ireland, Scotland and Wales, survives in England)
- Agrostemma githago, corncockle (died out in Ireland, reintroduced) persists in all countries of the United Kingdom
- Ajuga genevensis, blue bugle (extinct across the whole of the British Isles since 1967)
- Anthemis arvensis, corn chamomile (died out in Ireland, reintroduced) persists in all countries of the United Kingdom
- Arnoseris minima, lamb-succory (extinct across the British Isles in 1971) one recent sighting in England
- Aulacomnium turgidum, swollen thread moss (extinct in England since 1878) persists in Scotland
- Bartramia aprica, upright apple-moss (extinct in England since 1864) persists in Wales
- Bromus interruptus, interrupted brome (died out in the wild globally in 1970). It was reintroduced from stored seed in 2004 but this reintroduction subsequently failed. It was reintroduced again in the 2010s.
- Bryum calophyllum, matted bryum (extinct in England since 1983) may persist in Scotland
- Ptychostomum turbinatum, topshape thread-moss (extinct across the British Isles since the 1940s)
- Carex davalliana, Davall's sedge (extinct across the British Isles since 1852)
- Carex trinervis, three-nerved sedge (extinct across the British Isles since 1869)
- Caucalis platycarpos, small bur parsley (extinct across the British Isles since the 1950s)
- Centaurium scilloides, perennial centaury (died out in England in 1967) possibly persists in Wales and the south of England
- Conostomum tetragonum, helmet-moss (extinct in England since the 1950s) persists in Scotland
- Crepis foetida, stinking hawksbeard (died out across the British Isles in 1980) (reintroduced)

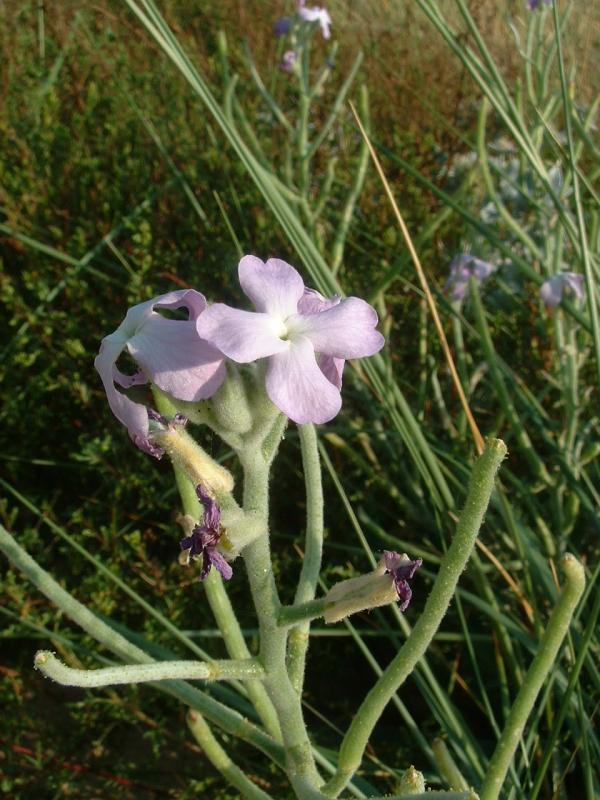
Matthiola sinuata is extinct in Scotland and possibly Ireland and rare or absent in the rest of the British Isles

- Cynodontium polycarpon, many-fruited dogtooth (extinct across the British Isles since the 1960s)
- Cynoglossum germanicum green houndstongue (died out in Scotland) persists in England
- Cystopteris alpina, alpine bladder-fern (extinct across the British Isles since 1911)
- Cystopteris montana, mountain bladder-fern (died out in England in 1880) persists in Scotland
- Dicranum elongatum, dense fork-moss (extinct across the British Isles since the late 1800s)
- Diplophyllum taxifolium, alpine earwort (died out in England in the 1950s) persists in Scotland
- Epipogium aphyllum, ghost orchid (England only, was extinct for several years, rediscovered, extinction very likely)
- Euphorbia peplis, purple spurge (extinct in England since 1951) persists in Northern Ireland
- Euphorbia villosa, hairy spurge (died out in England in 1924) one recent sighting in England
- Galeopsis segetum, downy hempnettle (died out in England in 1975) a few recent sightings in England, Wales and Ireland
- Gyroweisia reflexa, reflexed beardless moss (extinct across the British Isles since 1938)
- Helodium blandowii, Blandow's bogmoss (extinct across the British Isles since 1901)
- Herzogiella striatella, Muhlenbeck's feather-moss (died out in England in the 1950s) persists in Scotland
- Hieracium cambricogothicum, Llanfairfechan hawkweed (was an endemic, so globally extinct since 2008)
- Kiaeria falcata, sickle-leaved fork-moss (died out in England in the 1950s) persists in Scotland and Wales
- Matthiola sinuata, sea stock (died out in Ireland and Scotland) persists in Wales and England
- Najas flexilis, slender naiad (died out in England in 1982) persists in Scotland and Ireland

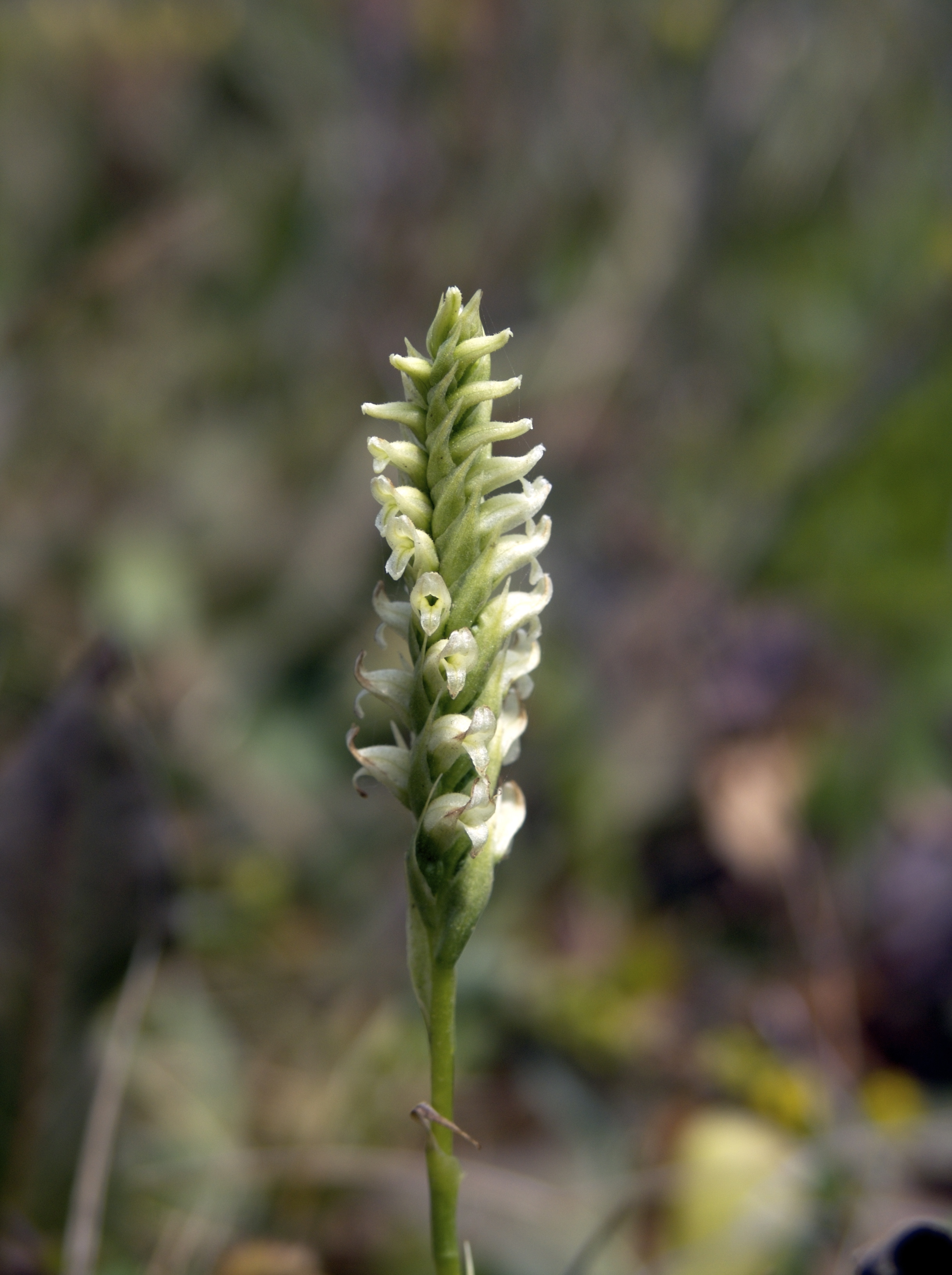
Spiranthes romanzoffiana recently became extinct in England

- Nitella gracilis, slender stonewort (died out in England in 1914) may survive in Scotland
- Otanthus maritimus, cottonweed (died out in England in 1936) persists in Ireland
- Paludella squarrosa, tufted fen-moss (extinct across the UK since 1916)
- Philonotis tomentella, woolly apple-moss (died out in England in the 1950s) persists in Scotland
- Pohlia proligera, bent-bud thread-moss (died out in England in the 1950s) persists in Scotland and one recent sighting in England
- Polygonatum verticillatum, whorled solomon's-seal (reintroduced or reestablished)
- Pterygoneurum lamellatum, spiral chalk moss (extinct across the British Isles since 1970)
- Ranunculus arvensis corn buttercup (extinct in Ireland since at least the 1930s and probably also extinct in Scotland)
- Saxifraga rosacea, Irish saxifrage (died out in England in 1960) persists in Wales and Ireland
- Scandix pecten-veneris, shepherd's needle (extinct in Ireland) persists in Scotland, Wales and England
- Scheuchzeria palustris, Rannoch rush (extinct in England since 1900, extinct in Ireland) persists in Scotland
- Serratula tinctoria, saw-wort (extinct in Ireland) persists in England and Wales
- Sphagnum obtusum, obtuse bog moss (extinct across the British Isles since 1911)
- Sphagnum strictum, pale bog moss (extinct across the British Isles since the 1950s) 2 recent unconfirmed sightings in Scotland
- Spiranthes aestivalis, summer lady's-tresses (extinct across the British Isles since the 1950s)
- Spiranthes romanzoffiana, Irish lady's tresses (extinct in England since the 1990s) persists in Scotland, Ireland and Northern Ireland, recently spread to Wales
- Tetrodontium repandum, small four-tooth moss (extinct across the British Isles since 1958)
- Tolypella nodifica, bird's nest stonewort (extinct across the British Isles since 1956)

Mosses feature frequently in the list. The flowering plant families appearing most frequently in the list are the Asteraceae and the Orchidaceae. Commonly cited reasons for plant extinctions in the UK include habitat loss, drainage, changes to farming systems and overgrazing. The most threatened habitats in the UK include meadows, peat bogs and marshes. The United Kingdom and Ireland both have a relatively small proportion of forest cover compared to other countries. In 2017 the UK was 13% forested In 2019 Ireland was just 11% forested. Charities involved in plant conservation in the UK include The Wildlife Trusts, Plantlife, The Botanical Society of Britain and Ireland, Back From The Brink and Chester Zoo. Sightings of any of these species should be reported to the Botanical Society of Britain and Ireland, or the British Bryological Society in the case of mosses.

== See also ==
- List of European species extinct in the Holocene
- List of mammals from the British Isles extinct since the Late Pleistocene
- List of mammals of Great Britain
- List of mammals of Ireland
- Introduced species of the British Isles
- Timeline of prehistoric Britain
