= List of mammals from the British Isles extinct since the Late Pleistocene =

This is a list of mammals of the British Isles extinct (either globally or locally extinct) since the beginning of the Late Pleistocene approximately 130,000 years ago, and also including animals extinct in the Holocene.

== Taxa ==
"†" denotes globally extinct species, "*" denotes introduced species that subsequently became extinct.

Common name	Species	Order and family	Extinction/extirpation date	Notes and references
Hippopotamus	Hippopotamus amphibius	Artiodactyla	c. 115,000 BP	Present during the Last (Eemian/Ipswichian) Interglacial. Survived elsewhere in Europe until around 40–30,000 years ago and still extant in Africa
†Straight-tusked elephant	Palaeoloxodon antiquus	Proboscidea: Elephantidae	c. 87,000 BP	Present during the Last (Eemian/Ipswichian) Interglacial, and the early part of the Last Glacial Period. Survived elsewhere in Europe until around 40–30,000 years ago.
†Narrow-nosed rhinoceros	Stephanorhinus hemitoechus	Perissodactyla	c. 87,000 BP	Present during the Last (Eemian/Ipswichian) Interglacial, and the early part of the Last Glacial Period. Survived elsewhere in Europe until around 40–30,000 years ago.
†Neanderthal	Homo neanderthalensis	Primates: Hominidae	c. 50,000 BP	Have left some genetic traces in modern humans.
†Cave lion	Panthera spelaea	Carnivora	c. 40,000 BP	Survived elsewhere until 14–13,000 years ago.
†Woolly rhinoceros	Coelodonta antiquitatis	Perissodactyla	c. 35,000 BP	Survived elsewhere until at least 14,000 years ago
†Cave hyena	Crocuta crocuta spelaea	Carnivora	c. 32,000 BP	Present in both Britain and Ireland.
†Scimitar-toothed cat	Homotherium latidens	Carnivora	c. 28,000 BP	Only unambiguous Late Pleistocene remains are a single specimen from the southern North Sea dating to c. 28,000 years ago.
†Steppe bison	Bison priscus	Artiodactyla	c. 28,000 BP	
Polar bear	Ursus maritimus	Carnivora	c. 18,000 BP	
†Woolly mammoth	Mammuthus primigenius	Proboscidea: Elephantidae	c. 14,500–14,000 BP	
†Irish elk	Megaloceros giganteus	Artiodactyla	c. 12,000 BP	
Reindeer	Rangifer tarandus	Artiodactyla	c. 11,000 BP	Extirpated in Ireland c. 7500 BC.
Saiga antelope	Saiga tatarica	Artiodactyla	c. 12,000 BP	
Muskox	Ovibos moschatus	Artiodactyla	prior to 12000 BP	
Wolverine	Gulo gulo	Carnivora	c. 11,000 BP	
Arctic lemming	Dicrostonyx torquatus	Rodentia	c. 10,000 BP	
Steppe lemming	Lagurus lagurus	Rodentia	c. 10,000 BP	
Narrow-headed vole	Microtus gregalis	Rodentia	c. 10,000 BP	
Steppe pika	Ochotona pusilla	Lagomorpha	c. 10,000 BP	
Arctic fox	Vulpes lagopus	Carnivora	c. 10,000 BP	
Wild horse	Equus ferus ferus	Perissodactyla	c. 10,000 BP	Re-established proxy in the form of free-roaming domestic horses
Moose/elk	Alces alces	Artiodactyla	c. 5600 BP	
Root vole	Microtus oeconomus	Rodentia	c. 1,500 BC	
†Aurochs	Bos primigenius primigenius	Artiodactyla	c. 1000 BC	Select breeds of free-roaming domestic cattle are used as an ecological proxy as part of some conservation grazing initiatives.
Walrus	Odobenus rosmarus	Carnivora	c. 1000 BC	Extirpated as a breeder; occasional vagrant
Brown bear	Ursus arctos	Carnivora	c. 500	c. 1000 – 500 BC in Ireland; see Bears in Ireland
Eurasian lynx	Lynx lynx	Carnivora	c. 700 or c. 1760	Subfossil evidence suggests an early medieval extinction, but a written record indicates persistence in Scotland into the late 18th century.
Wild boar	Sus scrofa	Artiodactyla	c. 1400	Reintroduced to Britain, extirpated from Ireland.
Eurasian beaver	Castor fiber	Rodentia: Castoridae	1526	Reintroduced to Britain; never known to have lived in Ireland
Grey wolf	Canis lupus	Carnivora	1786	1166 in Wales, 1390 in England, 1680 in Scotland/Britain, 1786 in Ireland; see Wolves in Great Britain and Wolves in Ireland
*Muskrat	Ondatra zibethicus	Rodentia	1937	Introduced, non-native; eradicated in 1937.
*Siberian roe deer	Capreolus pygargus	Artiodactyla	1945	Non-native, introduced in England from escapees in early 20th century; exterminated by 1945
*Coypu	Myocastor coypus	Rodentia	1978	Modern, introduced non-native; eradicated in Britain in 1978, introduced to Ireland in 2010.
Greater mouse-eared bat	Myotis myotis	Chiroptera	1990	A solitary male was recorded at a single hibernation site in Sussex from 2002 to 2022. In 2023 two individuals were recorded in Sussex. Species is effectively extirpated, with no maternity sites found in the UK.
