= Wolves in the British Isles =

Wolves in the British Isles may refer to:

- Wolves in Great Britain
- Wolves in Ireland
