= List of mammals of Great Britain =

The diversity of mammal fauna of Great Britain is somewhat impoverished compared to that of Continental Europe, due to the short period of time between the last ice age and the flooding of the land bridge between Great Britain and the rest of Europe. Only land species which crossed before the creation of the English Channel and those introduced by humans exist in Great Britain. This list includes mammals from the small islands around Great Britain and the Channel Islands. There are no endemic mammal species in Great Britain, although there are 6 endemic subspecies.

IUCN status abbreviations
CR	Critically Endangered	In imminent risk of extinction in the wild
EN	Endangered	Facing an extremely high risk of extinction in the wild
VU	Vulnerable	Facing a high risk of extinction in the wild
NT	Near Threatened	Doesn't meet any criteria that would categorise it as risking extinction but likely to in the future
LC	Least Concern	No current identifiable risks to this species
DD	Data Deficient	Inadequate information to make an assessment of the risks to this species

This article is based on the Red List for British Mammals for terrestrial mammals, and the Mammal Society's species list for marine mammals, unless otherwise referenced. Where the IUCN status in Great Britain differs from the global status, the Great Britain status is placed in brackets alongside "GB". "Introduced" means a species is not native to Great Britain and was introduced after 1500 CE. "Naturalised" means a species is not native to Great Britain, but was introduced before 1500 CE, and thus is not invasive. "Vagrant" means a marine species which doesn't have an established population in Great Britain, but occasionally appears there.

== Rodents ==
Red squirrel in Anglesey

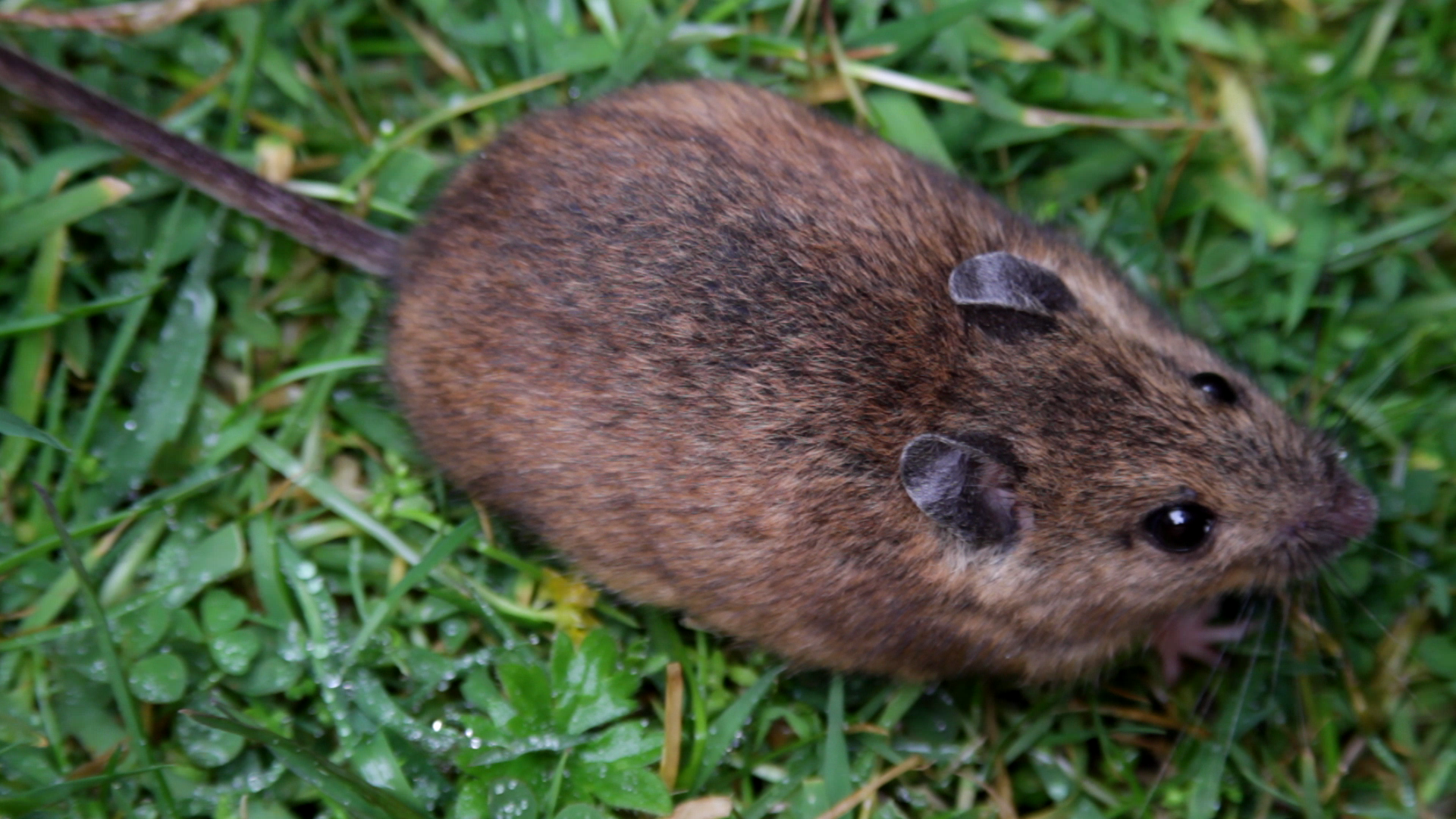
St Kilda field mouse – one of four endemic subspecies of rodent in Great Britain

Rodents are the largest order of mammals, making up over 40% of mammal species globally. They have two incisors in the upper and lower jaw which grow continually and must be kept short by gnawing.

Family: Castoridae (beavers)

- Eurasian beaver – Castor fiber LC (CR GB) (reintroduced)

Family: Cricetidae (voles)

- European water vole – Arvicola amphibius LC (EN GB)
- Short-tailed field vole – Microtus agrestis LC
- Orkney vole – Microtus arvalis orcadensis VU
- Bank vole – Myodes glareolus LC

Family: Muridae (rats and mice)

- Yellow-necked mouse – Apodemus flavicollis LC
- Wood mouse – Apodemus sylvaticus LC
  - St Kilda field mouse – Apodemus sylvaticus hirtensis
- Eurasian harvest mouse – Micromys minutus LC
- House mouse – Mus musculus LC (naturalised)
- Brown rat – Rattus norvegicus LC (introduced)
- Black rat – Rattus rattus LC (naturalised, likely extinct)

Family: Gliridae (dormice)

- European edible dormouse – Glis glis LC (introduced)
- Hazel dormouse – Muscardinus avellanarius LC (VU GB)

Family: Sciuridae (squirrels)

- Eastern grey squirrel – Sciurus carolinensis LC (introduced)
- Red squirrel – Sciurus vulgaris LC (EN GB)

== Lagomorphs ==
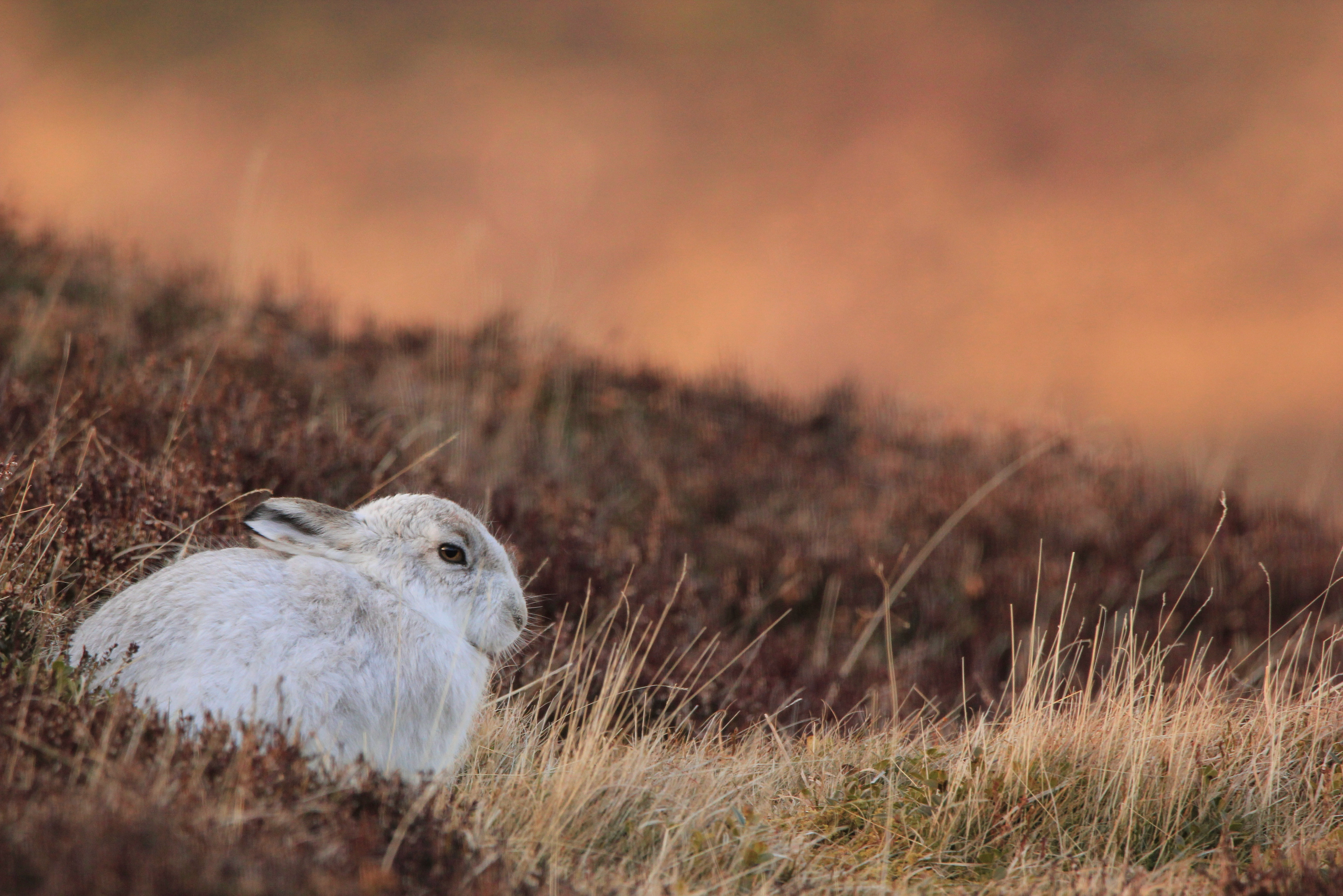
Mountain hare in the Cairngorms

Although lagomorphs can resemble rodents, and were classified as a superfamily in that order until the early 20th century, they have since been considered a separate order. They differ from rodents in a number of physical characteristics, such as having four incisors in the upper jaw rather than two.

Family: Leporidae (rabbits and hares)

- European hare – Lepus europaeus LC (naturalised)
- Mountain hare – Lepus timidus LC
- European rabbit – Oryctolagus cuniculus NT (naturalised)

== Eulipotyphlans ==
European hedgehog in the Scottish Borders

Hedgehogs are easily recognised by their spines, shrews closely resemble mice, and moles are stout-bodied burrowers.

Family: Erinaceidae (hedgehogs)

- European hedgehog – Erinaceus europaeus NT (VU GB)

Family: Soricidae (shrews)

- Greater white-toothed shrew – Crocidura russula LC (introduced)
- Lesser white-toothed shrew – Crocidura suaveolens LC (NT GB)
- Eurasian water shrew – Neomys fodiens LC
- Common shrew – Sorex araneus LC
- Eurasian pygmy shrew – Sorex minutus LC

Family: Talpidae (moles)

- European mole – Talpa europaea LC

== Bats ==
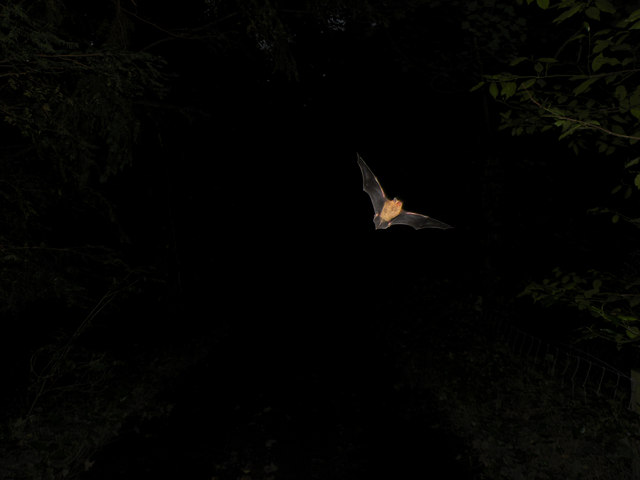
Common pipistrelle in Fife

The bats' most distinguishing feature is that their forelimbs are developed as wings, making them the only mammals capable of flight. Bat species account for about 20% of all mammal species globally.

Family: Rhinolophidae (horseshoe bats)

- Lesser horseshoe bat – Rhinolophus hipposideros LC
- Greater horseshoe bat – Rhinolophus ferrumequinum LC

Family: Vespertilionidae (vesper bats)

- Western barbastelle – Barbastella barbastellus NT (VU GB)
- Serotine bat – Eptesicus serotinus LC (VU GB)
- Alcathoe bat – Myotis alcathoe LC
- Bechstein's bat – Myotis bechsteinii NT (LC GB)
- Brandt's bat – Myotis brandtii LC
- Daubenton's bat – Myotis daubentonii LC
- Greater mouse-eared bat – Myotis myotis LC (CR GB) (likely extinct)
- Whiskered bat – Myotis mystacinus LC
- Natterer's bat – Myotis nattereri LC
- Lesser noctule – Nyctalus leisleri LC (NT GB)
- Common noctule – Nyctalus noctula LC
- Nathusius's pipistrelle – Pipistrellus nathusii LC (NT GB)
- Common pipistrelle – Pipistrellus pipistrellus LC
- Soprano pipistrelle – Pipistrellus pygmaeus LC
- Brown long-eared bat – Plecotus auritus LC
- Grey long-eared bat – Plecotus austriacus NT (EN GB)

== Carnivorans ==
Scottish wildcat in the British Wildlife Centre. Wildcats are critically endangered in Great Britain, but reintroduction efforts are underway

There are over 260 species of carnivorans globally, the majority of which feed primarily on meat. They have a characteristic skull shape and dentition.

Family: Canidae (dogs)

- Red fox – Vulpes vulpes LC

Family: Mustelidae (mustelids)

- European otter – Lutra lutra NT
- European pine marten – Martes martes LC
- European badger – Meles meles LC
- Stoat – Mustela erminea LC
- Feral ferret – Mustela furo (domesticated)
- Least weasel – Mustela nivalis LC
- European polecat – Mustela putorius LC
- American mink – Neogale vison LC (introduced)

Family: Felidae (cats)

- Scottish wildcat – Felis silvestris silvestris CR

Family: Phocidae (earless seals)

- Grey seal – Halichoerus grypus LC
- Harbour seal – Phoca vitulina LC

== Even-toed ungulates ==
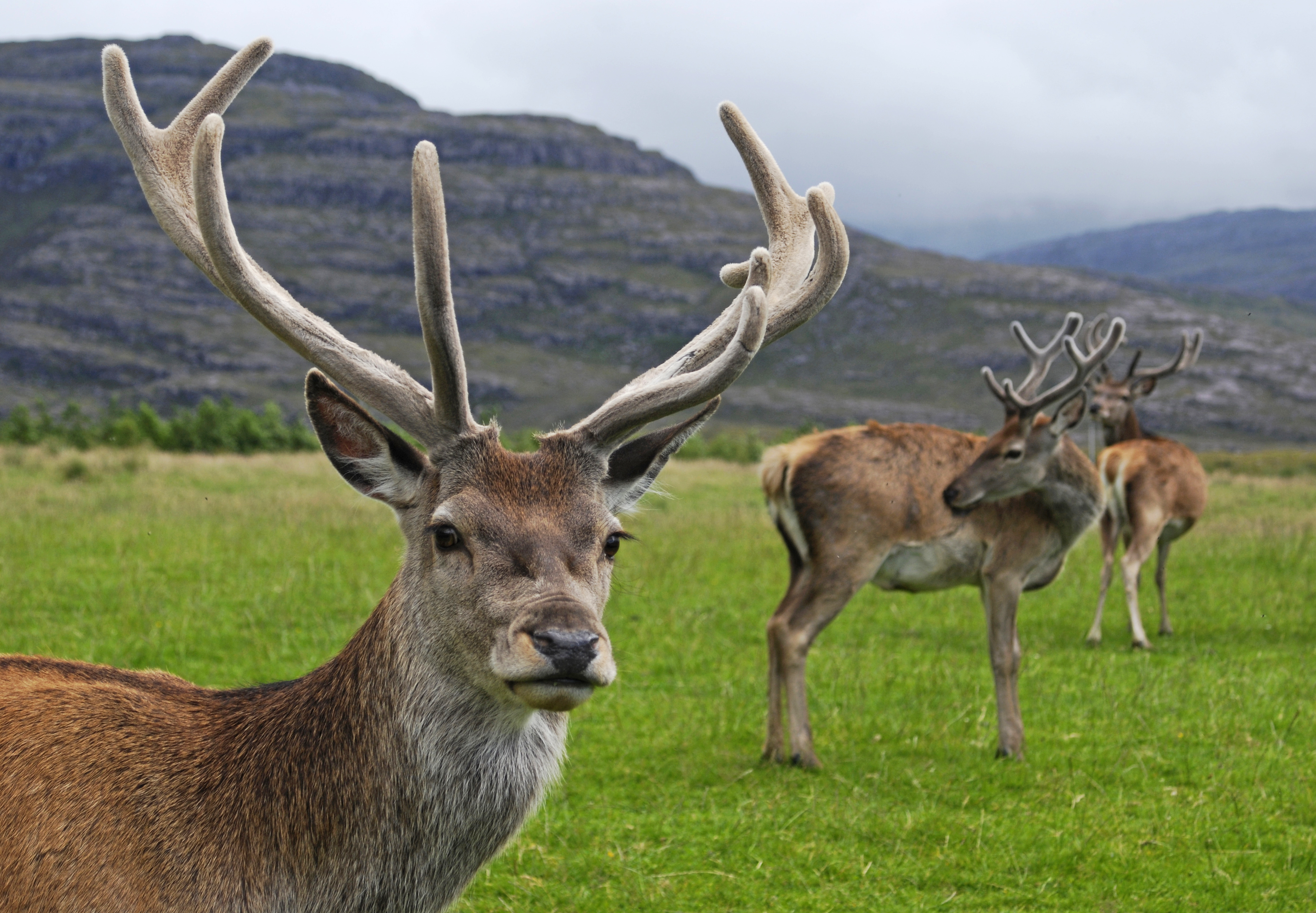
Scottish red deer – an endemic subspecies of red deer – in the Scottish Highlands

The even-toed ungulates are ungulates whose weight is borne about equally by the third and fourth toes, rather than mostly by the third as in perissodactyls. There are about 220 artiodactyl species globally.

Family: Suidae (pigs)

- Wild boar – Sus scrofa LC (reintroduced)

Family: Cervidae (deer)

- Roe deer – Capreolus capreolus LC
- Red deer – Cervus elaphus LC
  - Scottish red deer – Cervus elaphus scoticus LC
- Sika deer – Cervus nippon LC (introduced)
- European fallow deer – Dama dama LC (naturalised)
- Water deer – Hydropotes inermis VU (introduced)
- Reeves's muntjac – Muntiacus reevesi LC (introduced)

Family: Bovidae (bovines)

- European bison – Bison bonasus NT (reintroduced)

== Whales and dolphins ==
Bottlenose dolphin in Northumberland

The order Cetacea includes whales, dolphins and porpoises. They are the mammals most fully adapted to aquatic life: they have a spindle-shaped, nearly hairless body, protected by a thick layer of blubber, and forelimbs and tail modified to provide propulsion underwater.

Family: Balaenidae (right whales and bowhead whales)

- North Atlantic right whale – Eubalaena glacialis CR (vagrant)

Family: Balaenopteridae (rorquals)

- Common minke whale – Balaenoptera acutorostrata LC
- Sei whale – Balaenoptera borealis EN
- Blue whale – Balaenoptera musculus EN (vagrant)
- Fin whale – Balaenoptera physalus VU
- Humpback whale – Megaptera novaeangliae LC

Family: Phocoenidae (porpoises)

- Harbour porpoise – Phocoena phocoena LC

Family: Physeteridae (sperm whales)

- Sperm whale – Physeter macrocephalus VU

Family: Kogiidae (pygmy and dwarf sperm whales)

- Pygmy sperm whale – Kogia breviceps LC (vagrant)

Family: Ziphiidae (beaked whales)

- Northern bottlenose whale – Hyperoodon ampullatus NT
- Sowerby's beaked whale – Mesoplodon bidens LC (vagrant)
- True's beaked whale – Mesoplodon mirus LC
- Cuvier's beaked whale – Ziphius cavirostris LC

Family: Delphinidae (oceanic dolphins)

- Common dolphin – Delphinus delphis LC
- Risso's dolphin – Grampus griseus LC
- White-beaked dolphin – Lagenorhynchus albirostris LC
- Atlantic white-sided dolphin – Leucopleurus acutus LC
- Orca – Orcinus orca DD
- False killer whale – Pseudorca crassidens NT (vagrant)
- Striped dolphin – Stenella coeruleoalba LC
- Bottlenose dolphin – Tursiops truncatus LC

== Marsupials ==
Although marsupials are only native to Australasia and the Americas, the red-necked wallaby has been introduced to parts of Great Britain. A population has been breeding in Scotland on the island of Inchconnachan since 1975. A breeding population may exist in the Chiltern Hills. Other populations existed in Devon, the Peak District, Ashdown Forest, and the Channel Islands, but they are now extinct. There is an established population on the Isle of Man.

Family: Macropodidae (kangaroos, wallabies, and kin)

- Red-necked wallaby – Notamacropus rufogriseus LC (introduced)

== Locally extinct ==
- Grey wolf – Canis lupus, see Wolves in Great Britain

== Globally extinct ==
The St Kilda house mouse was an endemic subspecies of house mouse found only on the island of St Kilda. However, it went extinct in the 1930s after the evacuation of the island.

- St Kilda house mouse – Mus musculus muralis

== See also ==
- Biota of the Isle of Man
- List of endemic species of the British Isles
- List of extinct animals of the British Isles
- List of mammals of Ireland
