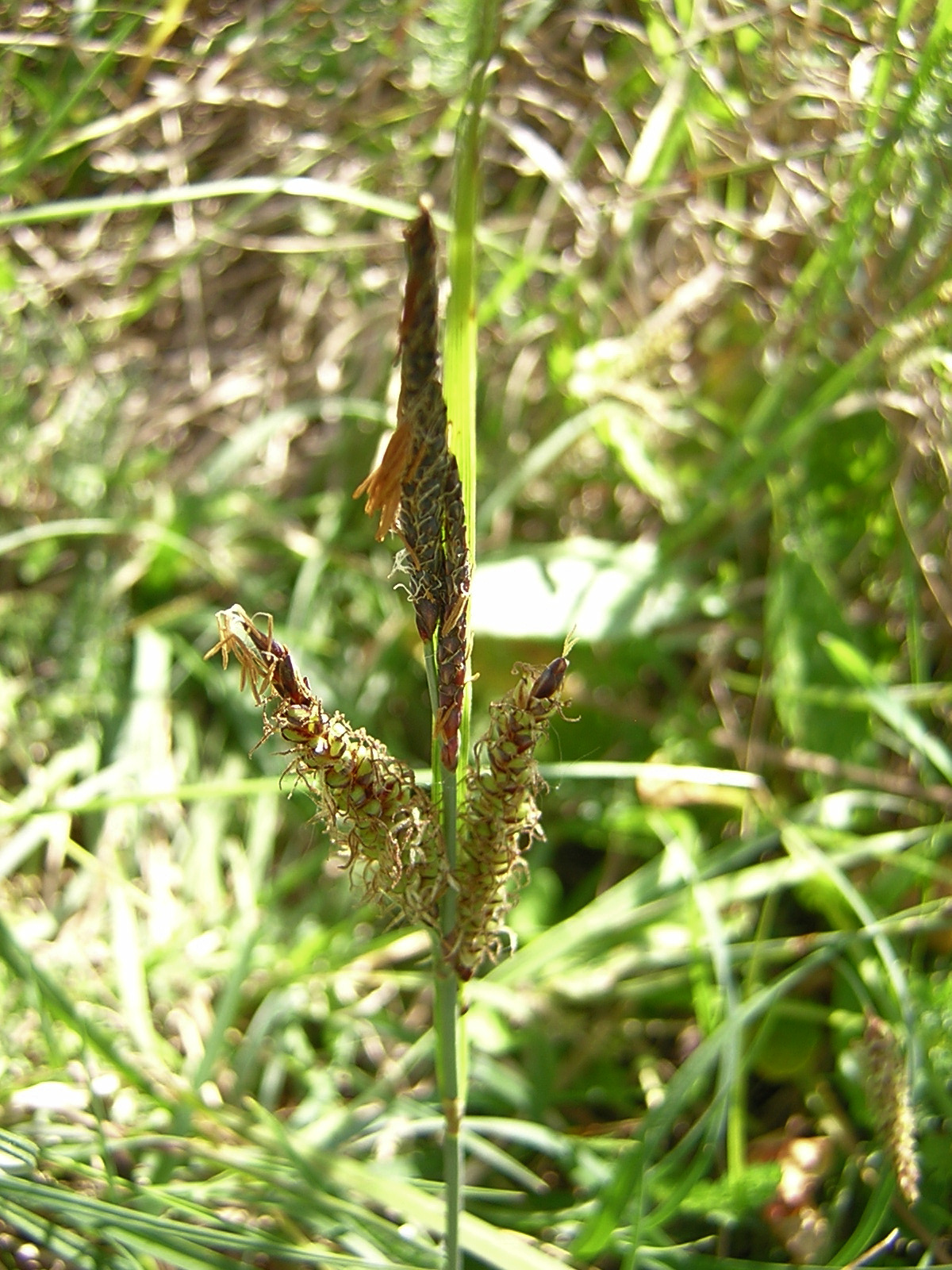

Scientific classification
- Kingdom: Plantae
- Clade: Tracheophytes
- Clade: Angiosperms
- Clade: Monocots
- Clade: Commelinids
- Order: Poales
- Family: Cyperaceae
- Genus: Carex
- Species: C. trinervis

Binomial name
- Carex trinervis Degl.

Synonyms
- Carex cerina; Carex frisica; Osculisa trinervis; Vignea trinervis

= Carex trinervis =

Species of grass-like plant

Carex trinervis is a species of sedge which is native to Europe.

It is a perennial herb, which grows to a height of 40 cm, has glaucous leaves and spreads by stolons. It bears 2–3, sessile, oblong inflorescences per shoot.

It is found in sandy marshes, damp dune slacks and heaths in coastal areas of Western Europe. In the British Isles it was only ever identified in Ormesby, Norfolk, where it became extinct in 1869.

== See also ==
- List of extinct plants of the British Isles
