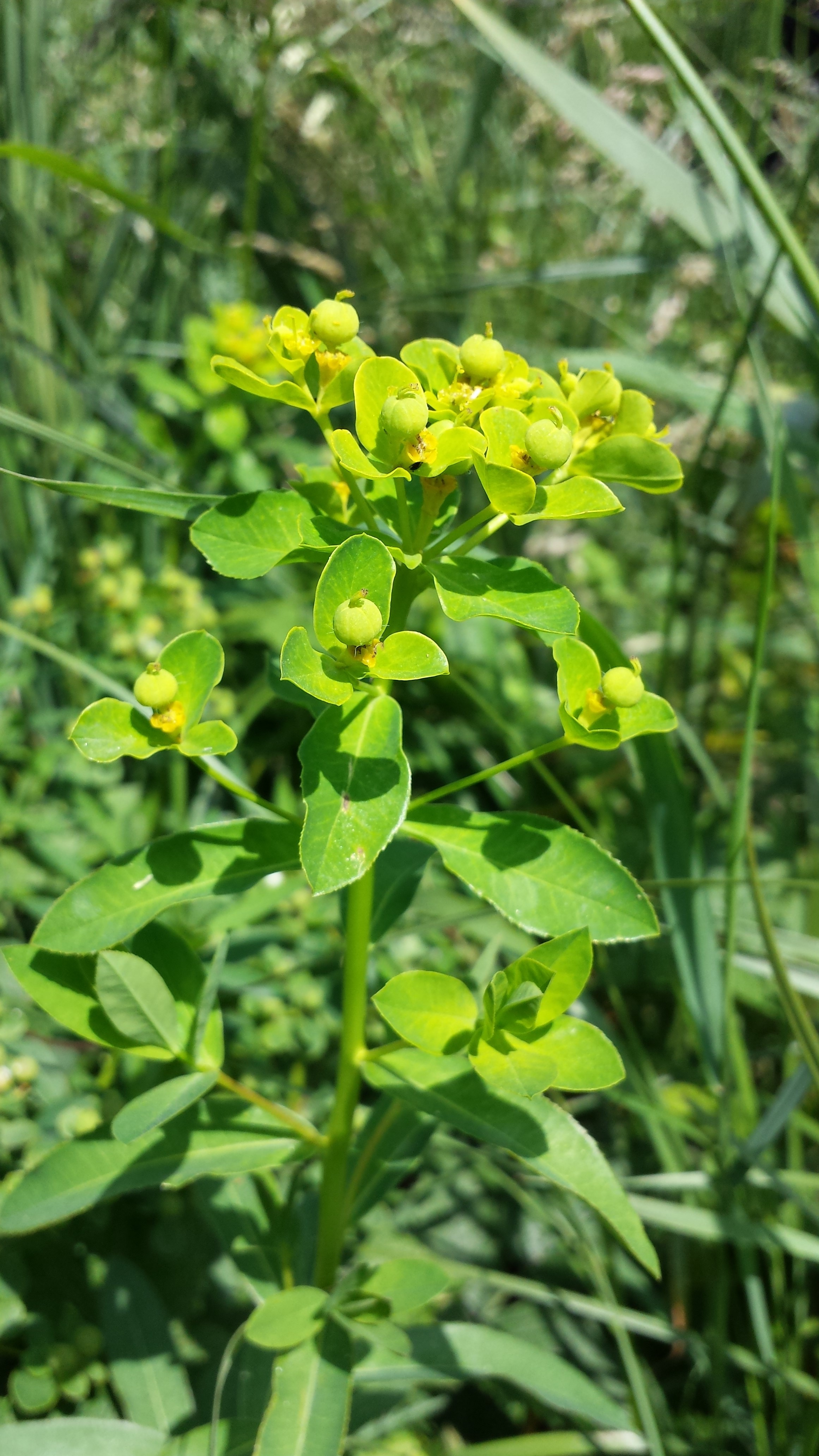
- Euphorbia villosa photographed in Austria in 2013

Scientific classification
- Kingdom: Plantae
- Clade: Tracheophytes
- Clade: Angiosperms
- Clade: Eudicots
- Clade: Rosids
- Order: Malpighiales
- Family: Euphorbiaceae
- Genus: Euphorbia
- Species: E. villosa

Binomial name
- Euphorbia villosa Waldst. Kit. ex. Willd.

Synonyms
- Euphorbia pilosa

= Euphorbia villosa =

Species of flowering plant

Euphorbia villosa, or hairy spurge, is a species of perennial, herbaceous plant in the family Euphorbiaceae.

== Description ==
It grows to a maximum height of 80 cm. It is named for the hairy undersides of its leaves. The leaves are lightly toothed towards the apex. Chromosomes 2n=20.

It is native to Europe. In the British Isles it has only been identified in England, where it became extinct in 1924.

== See also ==
- List of extinct plants of the British Isles
