= Cas Corach =

Irish mythological hero

In Irish mythology, Cas Corach was a hero who helped Caílte mac Rónáin kill three werewolf-like creatures, the daughters of Airitech who would come out of the Cave of Cruachan every year around Samhain and destroy sheep. The she-wolves liked music, so he aided in their slaying by playing a harp to attract and distract them and by persuading them to change to human form, while Caoilte cast a spear that penetrated all three, thereby killing them.

The Oxford Dictionary of Celtic Mythology states that Cas Corach, (also spelt Cascorrach, Cas Corrach), is a harper of Tuatha Dé Danann, who played for St. Patrick. He follows Caílte to learn of the lore of the Fenians, as told in the Acallam na Senòrach. It makes no reference to Airitech or his werewolf daughters.
