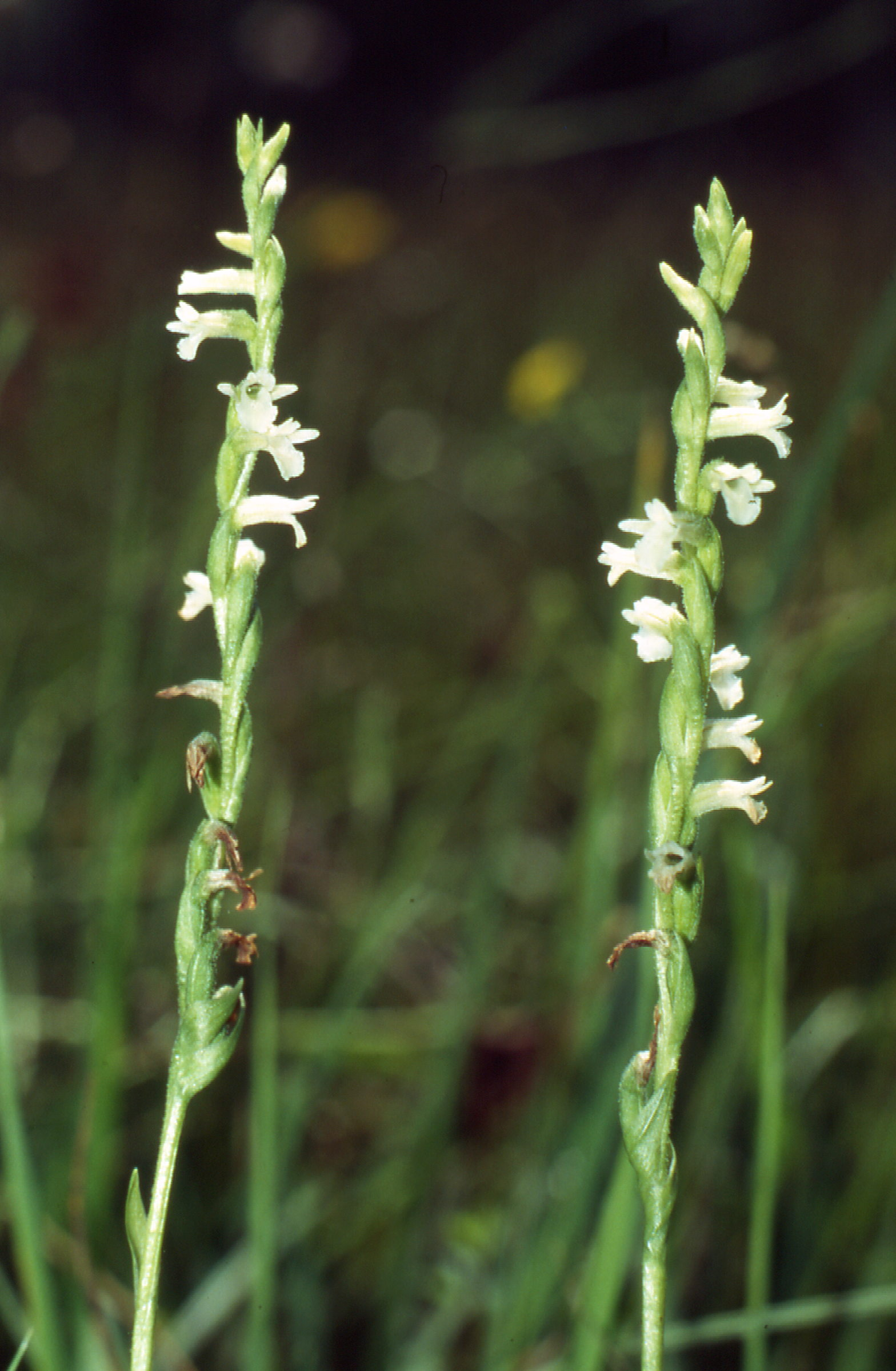

Scientific classification
- Kingdom: Plantae
- Clade: Tracheophytes
- Clade: Angiosperms
- Clade: Monocots
- Order: Asparagales
- Family: Orchidaceae
- Subfamily: Orchidoideae
- Tribe: Cranichideae
- Genus: Spiranthes
- Species: S. aestivalis

Binomial name
- Spiranthes aestivalis (Poir.) Rich. (1817)

Synonyms
- Ophrys aestivalis Poir. (basionym); Neottia aestivalis (Poir.) DC.; Gyrostachys aestivalis (Poir.) Dumort.; Ophrys aestiva Balb.

= Spiranthes aestivalis =

Summer lady's-tresses

Species of orchid

Spiranthes aestivalis, commonly called the summer lady's-tresses, is a species of orchid found in western Europe, Turkey, Russia, and North Africa. The specific epithet, aestivalis, is derived from Latin and means "pertaining to the summer".

It has become locally extinct in the British Isles.

== See also ==
- List of extinct plants of the British Isles
