= Timeline of prehistoric Britain =

Events from the prehistory of Britain (to 1 BC).

== Conventions ==
- This timeline focuses on species of Homo and covers the Pleistocene from the first evidence of humans.
- The names used for glaciations and interglacials are those with historic usage for Britain and may not reflect the full climate detail of modern studies.
- Dates for the Paleolithic are given as Before Present (BP), which uses 1 January 1950 as the commencement date of the age scale. All later dates are given as Before Christ (BC), which uses the conventional Gregorian calendar with AD 1 as the commencement date of the age scale.

== Events ==
=== Paleolithic ===
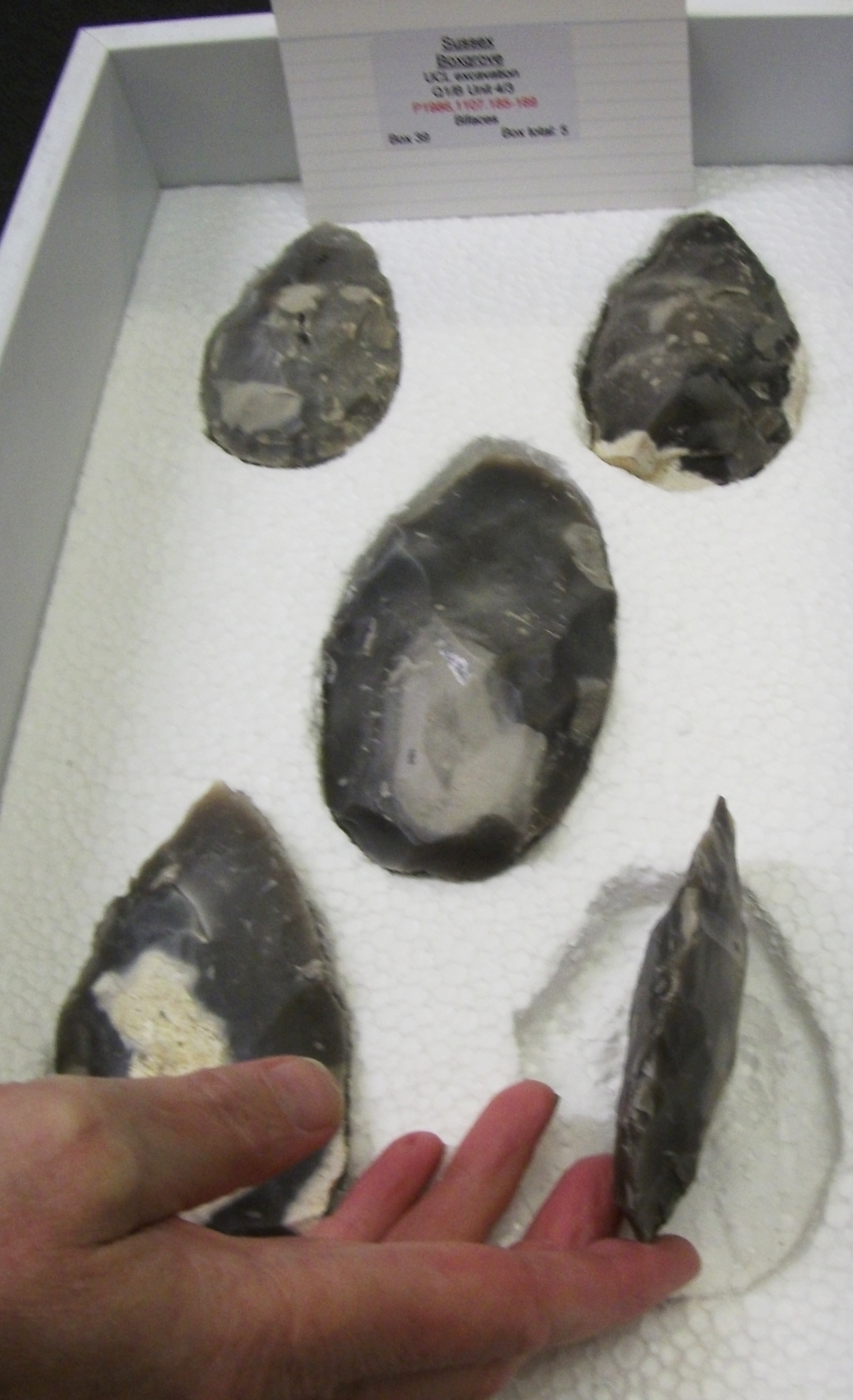
A selection of stone tools from Eartham Pit, Boxgrove

- c. 970,000 to 936,000 BP
  - Paleolithic flint tools at Happisburgh, Norfolk. The earliest known evidence of Homo sp. in Britain, presumed to be Homo antecessor.
- c. 700,000 BP
  - Flints tools at Pakefield. Possibly a cross between Homo antecessor and Homo heidelbergensis.
- c. 500,000 BP
  - Remains of Homo heidelbergensis at Eartham Pit, Boxgrove, Sussex. The earliest human remains found in Britain.
- c. 478,000 BP
  - Anglian glaciation begins – the most extreme in the Pleistocene. Britain extensively covered by ice.
- c. 450,000 BP
  - The Weald-Artois Anticline breaks for the first time after a glacial lake outburst flood. This landbridge to the continent was cut for the first time creating the English Channel. It would now reflood after every glaciation ended.
- c. 425,000 BP
  - Hoxnian Interglacial begins as the Anglian glaciation ends.
- c. 400,000 BP
  - Bones of a young female Neanderthal (Homo neanderthalensis) at Swanscombe Heritage Park, Kent. Earliest evidence of Neanderthals in Britain.
- c. 352,000 BP
  - Wolstonian glaciation begins. Neanderthal occupation intermittent.
- c. 180,000 BP
  - Neanderthals completely driven out. There will be little human occupation of any kind for many thousands of years.
- c. 160,000 BP
  - A second megaflood widens the break in the Weald-Artois Anticline.
- c. 130,000 BP
  - Ipswichian Interglacial begins.
- c. 125,000 BP
  - Rising sea levels cut Britain off completely from the continent. It is warm enough for hippos in the Thames and lions on the site of Trafalgar Square, but Neanderthals did not cross the landbridge in time so there are no Homo sp. present.
- c. 115,000 BP
  - Devensian glaciation ('Last Glacial Period') begins.
- c. 60,000 BP
  - Sea levels have dropped sufficiently for Neanderthals to return to Britain in the warmer periods, possibly only as summer visitors.
- c. 44,000-41,000 BP
  - Jawbone from Kents Cavern. First evidence of modern humans (Homo sapiens) in Britain.
- c. 40,000 BP
  - Neanderthals go extinct across Europe.
- c. 26,000-13,000 BP
  - Dimlington stadial ('Last Glacial Maximum'). Britain almost entirely under ice. Southern England a polar desert. Humans driven out.
- c. 16,500-14,670 BP
  - Windermere interstadial (the 'Allerød oscillation' or 'Late Glacial Interstadial'). Temperatures rise. Homo sapiens returns to Britain.
- c. 12,890-11,700 BP
  - Loch Lomond stadial ('Younger Dryas'). Temperatures drop rapidly. Humans driven out.
- c. 11,700 BP
  - The Holocene epoch begins as the Younger Dryas stadial ends. The first Mesolithic people arrive and this marks the start of continuous human (Homo sapiens only) occupation.

=== Mesolithic ===
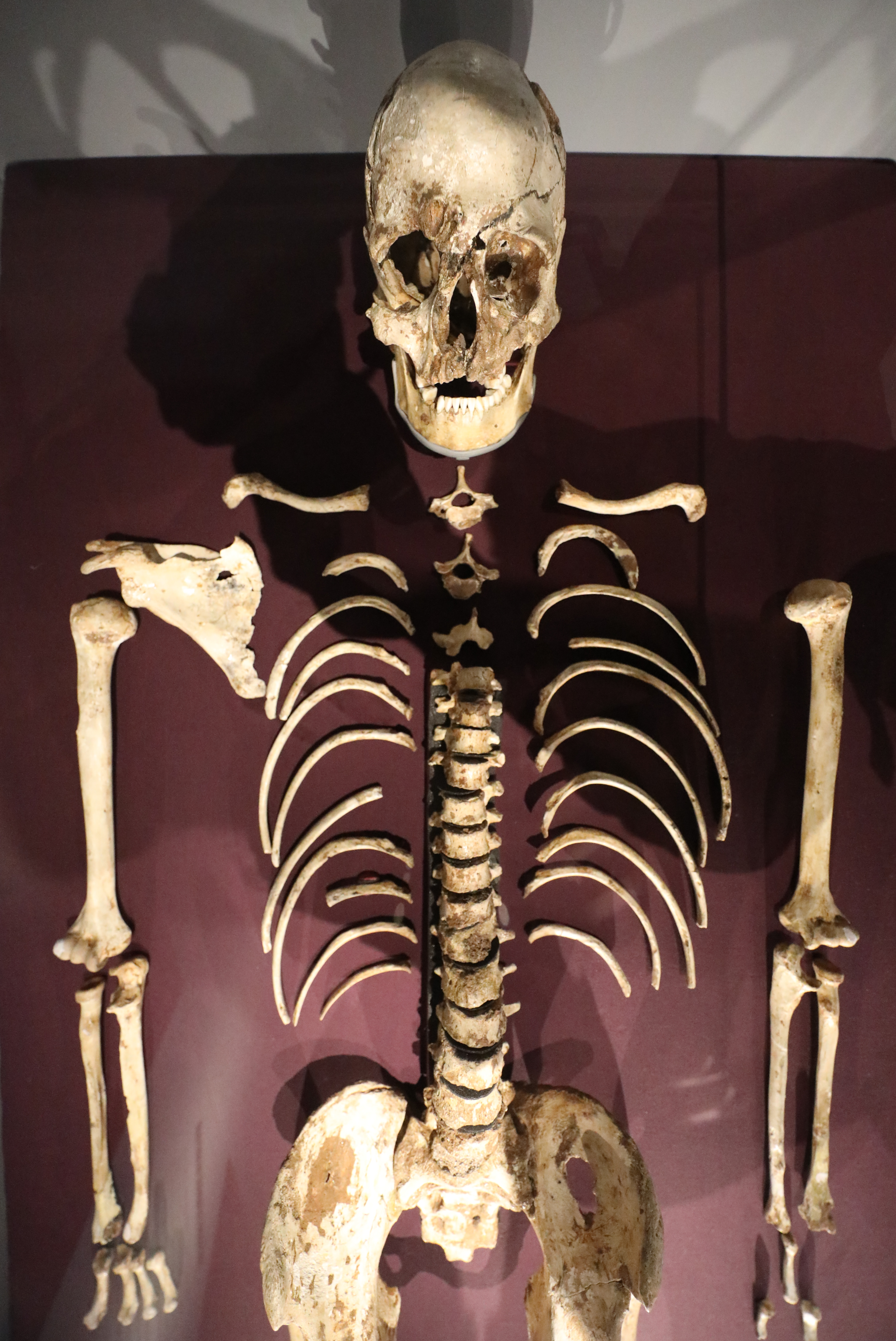
The upper body of the Cheddar Man a Mesolithic skeleton.

- c. 9335–9275 BC
  - The earliest date for structures and artefacts at Star Carr, Yorkshire, a site then inhabited for around 800 years.
- c. 7600 BC
  - Howick house, Northumberland, a Mesolithic building with stone tools, nut shells and bone fragments.
- c. 7150 BC
  - Cheddar Man, the oldest complete human skeleton in Britain
- c. 6500-6200 BC
  - Rising sea-levels cause the gradual flooding of Doggerland. The culminating tsunami caused by the Storegga Slide, likely contributes to the final isolation of Great Britain from the European mainland.
- c. 6000 BC
  - The earliest evidence of some form of agriculture: Wheat of a variety grown in the Middle East was present on the Isle of Wight.
- c. 4600-3065 BC
  - Date range of artefacts from a Mesolithic midden on Oronsay, Inner Hebrides, giving evidence of diet.

=== Neolithic ===
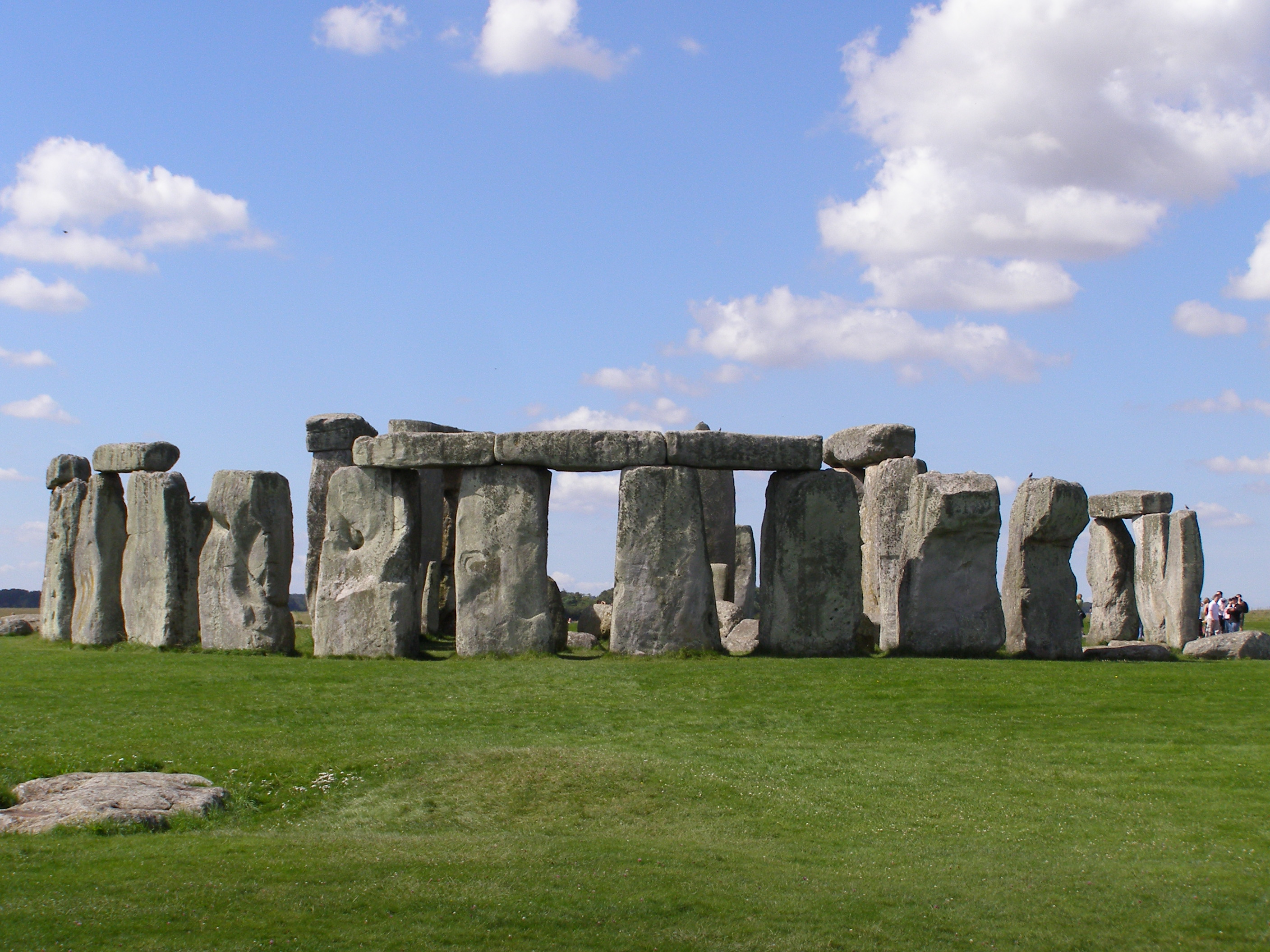
Stonehenge, a Neolithic stone monument constructed from 3000 BC to 2000 BC.

- c. 4000 BC
  - Neolithic period begins in Britain, introducing the first agriculture.
- c. 3500 BC
  - Garth tsunami impacts the Northern Isles.
- c. 3000 BC
  - First henge monuments.
- c. 2600 BC
  - Main phase of construction at Stonehenge begins, replacing earlier wooden and earthen works.
- c. 2300 BC
  - Arrival of the Beaker People in Britain, replacing 90% of the earlier population.

=== Bronze Age ===
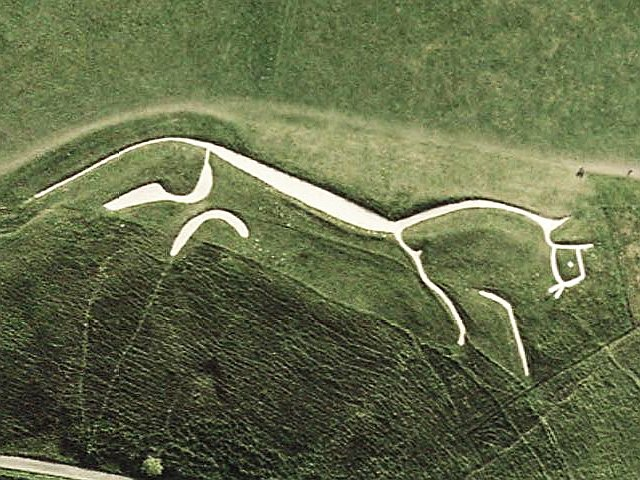
The Uffington White Horse, a Bronze Age hill figure.

- c. 1800 BC
  - Wessex culture brings bronze-working to Britain.
- c. 1600 BC
  - Last known major construction at Stonehenge.
- c. 1400 BC
  - Wessex culture replaced by more agrarian peoples; stone circles and early hillforts produced.
- c. 1380-550 BC
  - Uffington White Horse hill figure cut in Oxfordshire.

=== Iron Age ===
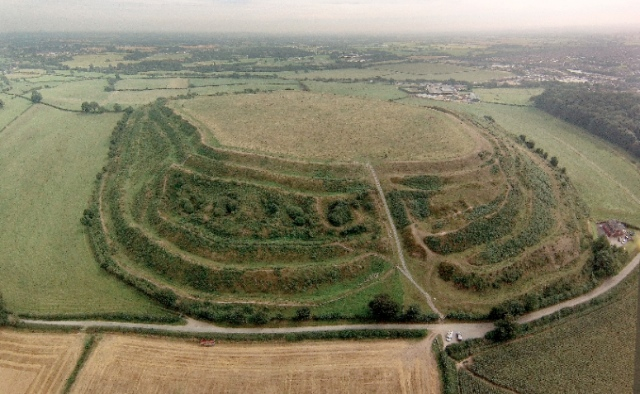
Old Oswestry, an Iron Age hillfort

- c. 800 BC
  - Celts bring iron working to Britain; Hallstatt Culture.
- c. 400 BC
  - Parisi tribe from northern France settle in Yorkshire.
  - First brochs constructed.
- c. 330 BC
  - Pytheas of Massilia circumnavigates Britain.
- c. 300 BC
  - La Tène artwork introduced from northern France.
- c. 100 BC
  - First wave of Belgic invaders settle in the south-east, establishing the Catuvellauni and Trinovantes tribes.
  - First coins introduced.
- c. 80 BC
  - Second wave of Belgic invaders settle in Sussex, Berkshire, and Hampshire, establishing the Atrebates and Regni tribes.
- 55 BC
  - Commius, chieftain of the Atrebates, captured by the British after serving as an envoy to Rome.
  - 26 August – Julius Caesar lands between Deal and Walmer, wins skirmishes against the British, and frees Commius.
  - 31 August – Britons in war-chariots defeat the Romans. Romans return to Gaul.
- 54 BC
  - July – Julius Caesar invades Britain and defeats the Catuvellauni under Cassivellaunus.
  - September – Tribute fixed, and peace agreed between the Catevellauni and the Trinovantes, allied with Rome. Romans return to Gaul.
- 50 BC
  - Fleeing to Britain after a failed revolt in Gaul, Commius becomes chieftain of the Atrebates.
- 34 BC
  - Emperor Octavian makes an alliance with the Atrebates and Trinovantes.
- c. 25 BC
  - Tincommius, leader of the Atrebates, issues Roman-style coinage.

== See also ==
- Timeline of prehistoric Scotland
- Prehistoric Britain
- List of extinct animals of the British Isles
- List of extinct plants of the British Isles
