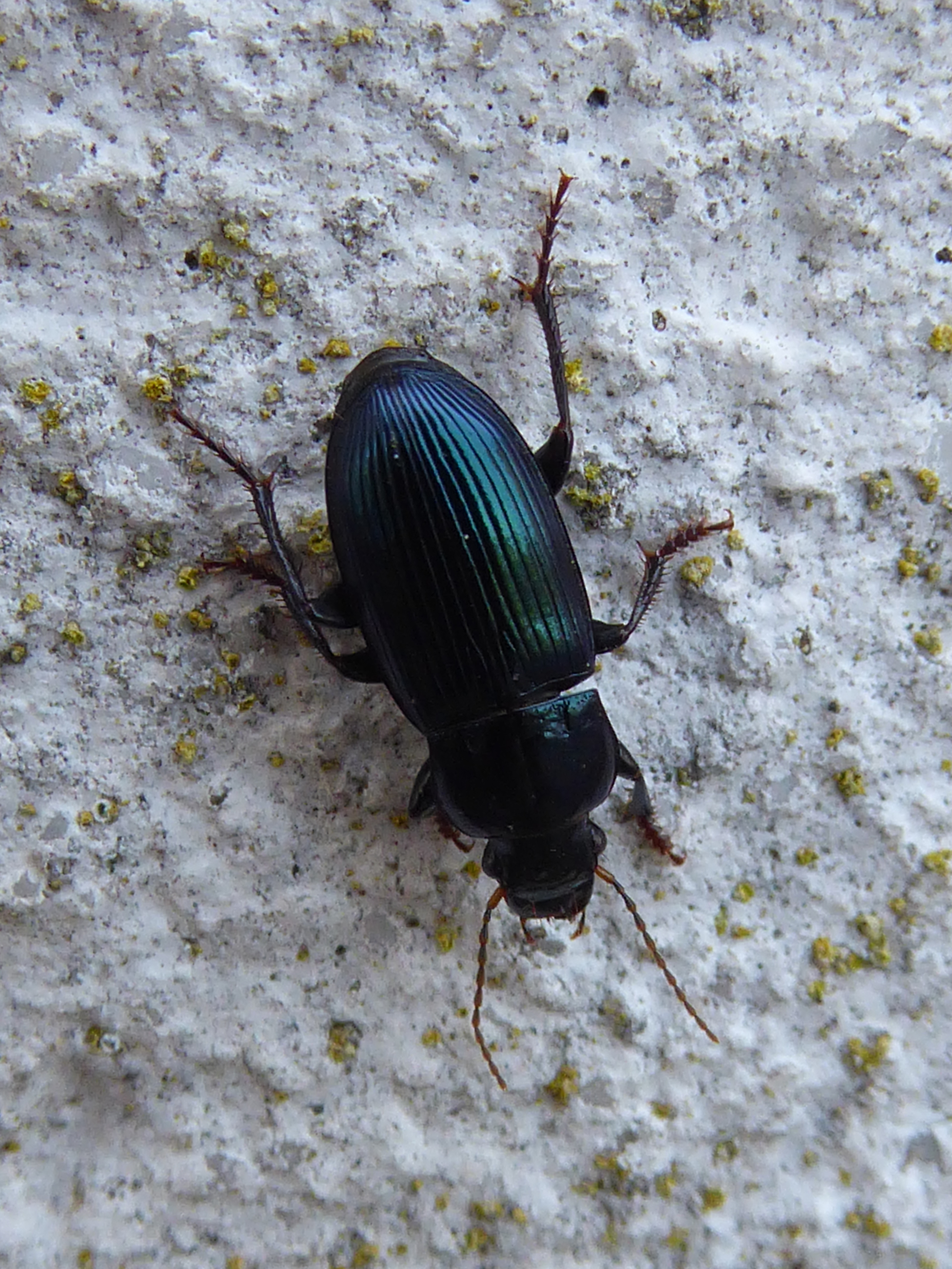

Scientific classification
- Kingdom: Animalia
- Phylum: Arthropoda
- Class: Insecta
- Order: Coleoptera
- Suborder: Adephaga
- Family: Carabidae
- Genus: Harpalus
- Species: H. honestus

Binomial name
- Harpalus honestus (Duftschmid, 1812)

Synonyms
- Carabus honestus (Duftschmid, 1812); Harpalus cuniculinus (Duftschmid, 1812); Harpalus ignavus (Duftschmid, 1812); Harpalus nitidus Sturm, 1818; Harpalus insignis Gautier Des Cottes, 1872; Harpalus janthinus Gautier Des Cottes, 1872; Harpalus pallidipes Reitter, 1918

= Harpalus honestus =

Species of beetle

Harpalus honestus is a species of ground beetle native to the Palearctic realm, including Europe and the Near East. In Europe, it is only absent in the following countries or islands: the Azores, the Baltic states, the Canary Islands, the Channel Islands, the Cyclades, the Dodecanese, the Faroe Islands, Franz Josef Land, Gibraltar, Iceland, Madeira, Malta, Moldova, Monaco, the North Aegean islands, Novaya Zemlya, Portugal, Russia (except for southern part), San Marino, the Savage Islands, Scandinavia, Svalbard and Jan Mayen, and Vatican City. Its presence on the island of Sicily is doubtful. It is also found in the Asian countries of Armenia, Iran, Syria, and Turkey.
