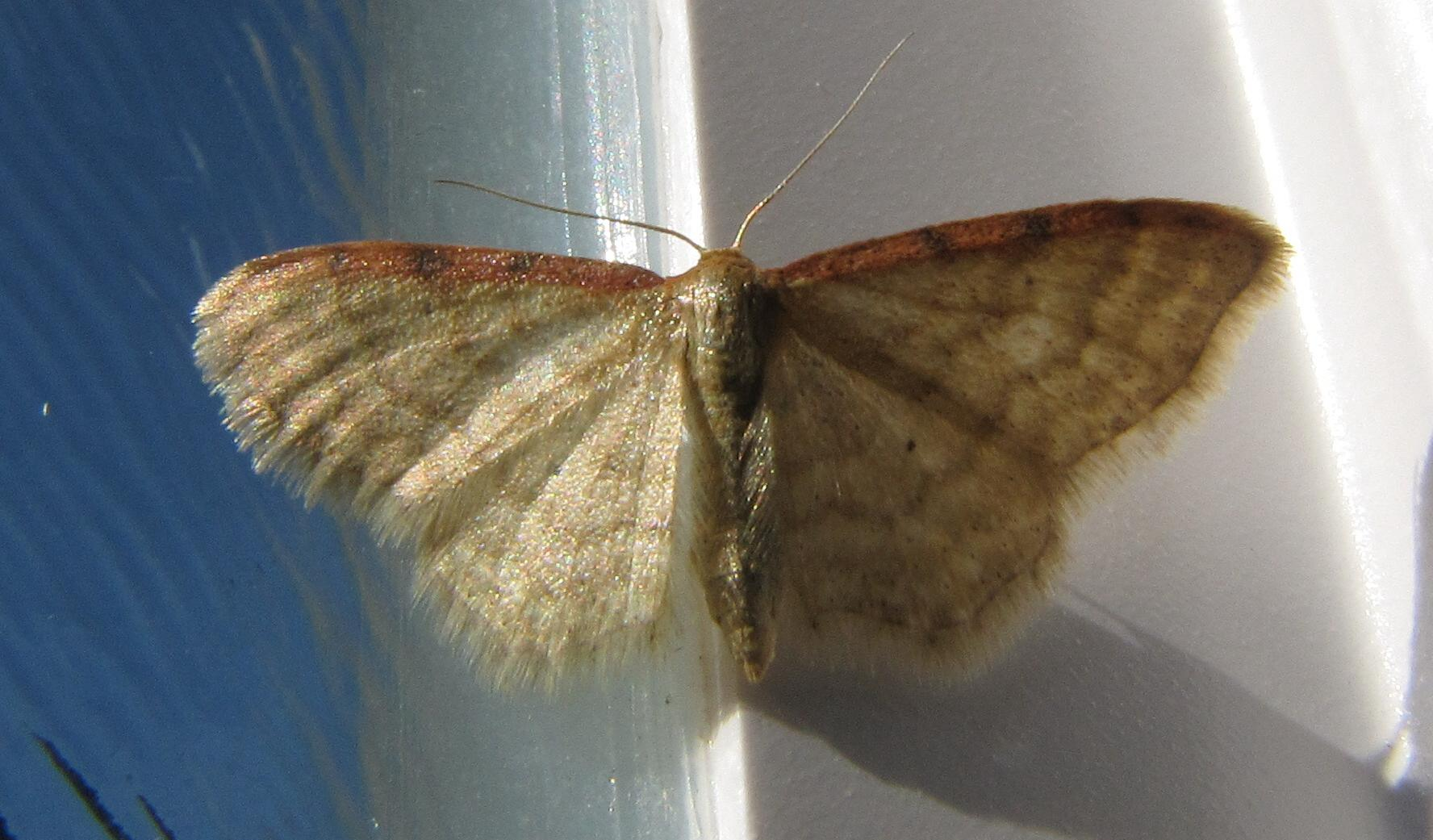

Scientific classification
- Kingdom: Animalia
- Phylum: Arthropoda
- Clade: Pancrustacea
- Class: Insecta
- Order: Lepidoptera
- Family: Geometridae
- Genus: Idaea
- Species: I. humiliata

Binomial name
- Idaea humiliata (Hufnagel, 1767)

= Idaea humiliata =

Isle of Wight wave

Species of moth

Idaea humiliata, the Isle of Wight wave, is a moth of the family Geometridae. It is found in Europe and Western Asia.

== Distribution ==
True to its name, this species was once found on the Isle of Wight, England, but became extinct there around 1931. There was one sighting in Portsmouth in 1954, but the moth appears to be currently extirpated from the United Kingdom.

== Description ==
The species has a wingspan of 19–22 mm. In the UK, the adults flew in one generation in July. "The caterpillar overwinters. The moths fly from June (rarely late May) to mid-August."

== Diet ==
The larvae feed on knotgrass, dandelion and dock in captivity. It is unknown what the natural foodplant is.
