= Bears in Ireland =

Animal formerly native to Ireland

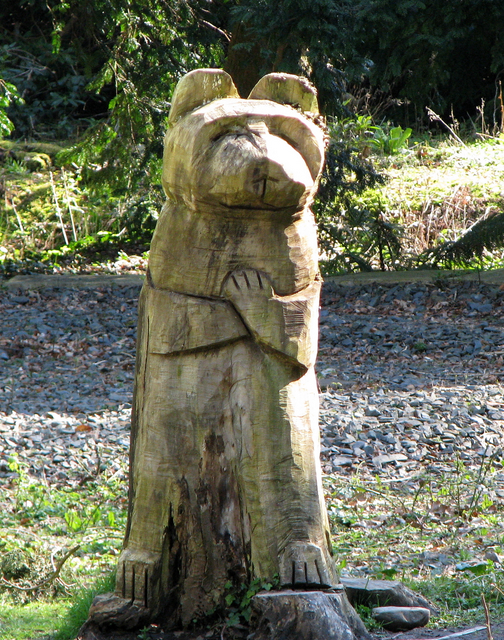
Statue of a bear, Mount Stewart

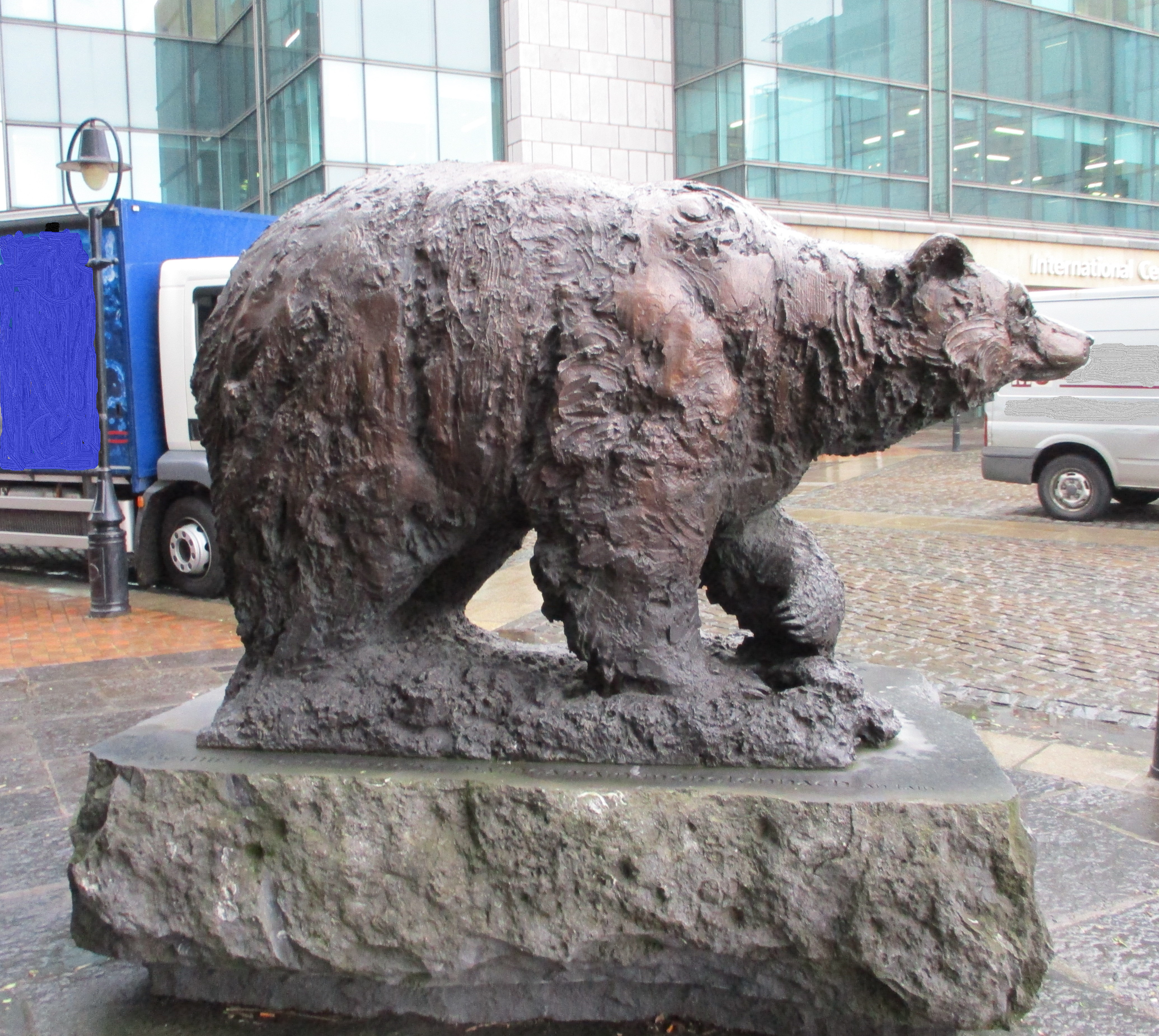
Bear sculpture at the International Financial Services Centre, Dublin

Bears were once common in Ireland but are now extinct on the island, having died out in the 1st millennium BC.

== History ==
A subspecies of the extant brown bear (Ursus arctos) evolved in, and was thus native to, ancient Ireland. This Irish brown bear likely lived much as bears do today, as a primarily carrion-scavenging, omnivorous grazer and browser, opportunistically consuming invertebrates and insect larvae, as well. Additionally, as modern bears do, the Irish brown bear would more than likely vary its broad diet throughout the year, hunting everything from ground-nesting birds and their eggs, rodents, lagomorphs and other small mammals to larger game such as red deer and wild boar, among other ungulates. Atlantic salmon was also a likely favourite, during the fishes' spawning season, in addition to a myriad of other marine and freshwater species; for bears living close to the ocean, it is also possible that they scavenged on stranded or washed-up cetacean remains, as modern polar bears have been documented doing. However, the bulk of a bear's diet, both today and likely in ancient bears, consists largely of wild berries, fruits, nuts and seeds, edible flowers, grasses and herbs.

Bears in Ireland often slept through the cold winter in caves, hollows, burrows or sheltered cliffsides, and several are known to have died during hibernation, with their bones being found by modern archaeologists. The most famous fossils were discovered in Poll na mBéar (literally "bear's hole") in County Leitrim, and Aillwee Cave, County Clare. Remains have also been found at Lough Gur; County Kildare; and County Longford. Perforated bear teeth (worn on necklaces) have been found in caves in County Clare. Teeth which "probably belonged to a bear" were found during the excavation of Annaghmare Court Tomb in County Armagh in the 1960s.

A bear patella bearing butchery marks has been dated to 10,860–10,641 BC; it was found in the Alice and Gwendoline Cave, County Clare.

DNA studies have shown that the Irish bear was intermediate between the modern brown bear and modern polar bear. This suggests that the Irish bear interbred with archaic polar bears during the Pleistocene. The Irish bear is believed to have died out circa 1000–500 BC, due to habitat loss and hunting.

== Terminology ==
In Old Irish, there are three words used for bear:

- art, from Proto-Celtic *artos and Proto-Indo-European *h₂ŕ̥tḱos; related to Greek ἄρκτος (arktos).
- math, from Proto-Celtic *matus, as in the Gaulish names Matugenos, Matuus, Teutomatus.
- beithir; its meaning "bear" is borrowed from the Germanic (Norse bera, English bear); it is believed to derive from a Proto-Celtic *betrix which referred to a monster or beast (as in Latin bēstia).

The word art fell out of use, with the word gamuin ("calf") being added to math to create mathgamain, and the word beithir being respelled as béar.

=== Personal names ===
The elements art and math often appear in personal names like Arthur or surnames such as MacMahon. In the 12th century Mathghamhain mac Conchobar Maenmaige Ua Conchobair was a prince of Connacht; Mathghamhain Maonmhaighe Ó Briain was King of Thomond in the 15th century; and Mathghamhain Ó hIfearnáin was a poet of the 16th century.

Art mac Cuinn, Art Imlech and Art mac Lugdach were legendary High Kings of Ireland; King Arthur's name is believed to be Brythonic for "bear-man"; and Art Óg mac Murchadha Caomhánach was a 14th-century king. The name Artrí ("bear-king") is also recorded; Artrí mac Cathail was King of Munster in the 8th–9th centuries, and Artrí mac Conchobair was briefly Abbot of Armagh in the 9th century. The surname O'Hart also derives from Ua hAirt, "descendant of Art"; they were based around the Hill of Tara before losing their land in the Norman invasion and resettling in County Sligo.

=== Toponyms ===
Bears died out in Ireland prior to the coming of the Celts, so their name does not appear in very many place names. The Beara Peninsula, Bear barony and Bere Island are not named for the mammal; the name is believed to have the same root as Iberia. Lismaha (Irish Lios Matha), a townland in County Roscommon, possibly means "bear ringfort", although it could also be "Matthew's ringfort."

== Captive bears and reintroduction ==
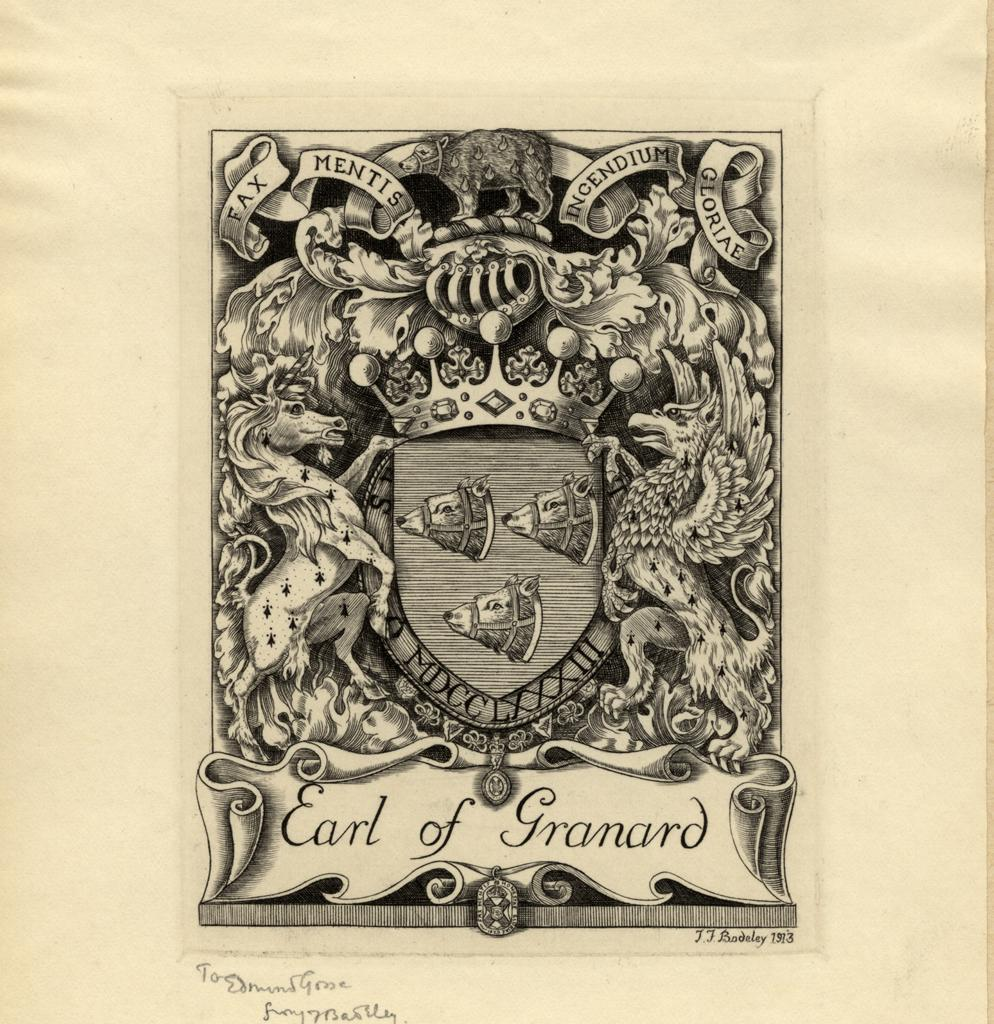
Arms of the Earls of Granard, featuring three bear heads. As is common in British heraldry, the bears are depicted wearing muzzles, perhaps reflecting the lack of wild bears in Great Britain and Ireland.

Bear-baiting took place in Ireland in the early modern period, with it being common in Belfast; a baiting in Dublin in 1726 led to a bull and bear escaping, with one bear "[seizing] one man by the leg and tore it to pieces." A bear-baiting took place in Cork in 1769.

Two polar bears lived in Dublin Zoo between the early 1980s and 2003. The female bear's behaviours caused concerns and an independent study was commissioned which found that bears need to be able to spend time alone when they choose. It was later moved to a zoo in Hungary where its needs could be accommodated better.

Habitat loss has made it impossible to reintroduce the bear to Ireland, but there are two brown bears — rescued from a private zoo in Lithuania — residing in Wild Ireland, a 23 acres (9.3 ha) reserve on the Inishowen Peninsula.

== Legend and myth ==
Bears occasionally appear in Irish mythology and folk tales, for example, in the tale of The Brown Bear of Norway.

== See also ==
- List of European species extinct in the Holocene
- Wolves in Ireland
