= Wolves in Great Britain =

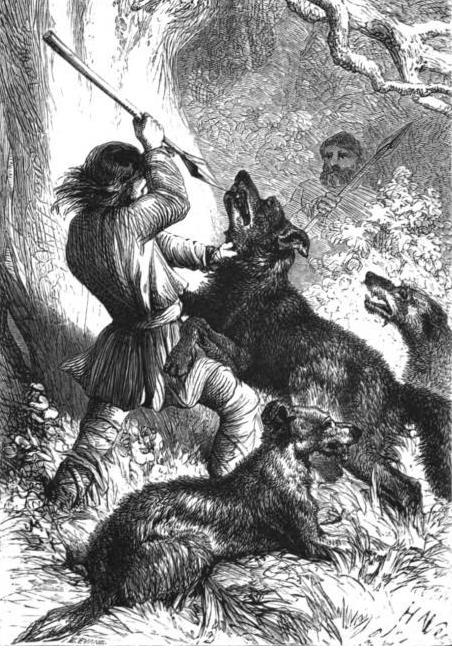
An Anglo-Saxon wolf-hunt as depicted in Thomas Miller's 1859 novel The British Wolf-Hunters.

Wolves were once present in Great Britain. Early writing from Roman and later Saxon chronicles indicate that wolves appear to have been extraordinarily numerous on the island. Unlike other British animals, wolves were unaffected by island dwarfism, with certain skeletal remains indicating that they may have grown as large as Arctic wolves. The species was progressively exterminated from Britain through a combination of deforestation and active hunting through bounty systems. According to folklore, last wolf in Great Britain was killed by Sir Ewen Cameron of Lochiel near the Scottish village of Killiecrankie in 1680.

== Past presence in England and Wales ==
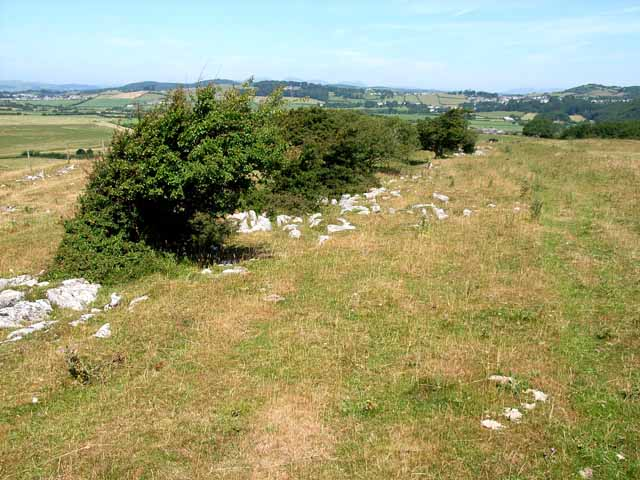
Humphrey Head, a limestone outcrop at the mouth of the Kent estuary where, allegedly, the last English wolf was killed in the 14th century.

The earliest known remains of wolves in Britain are from Bontnewydd Cave in Wales, dating to around 225,000 years ago, during the late Middle Pleistocene (Marine Isotope Stage 7). Wolves continuously occupied Britain since this time, despite dramatic climatic fluctuations. The Roman colonisation of Britain saw sporadic wolf-hunting. Exploitation of wild fauna was limited in the latter half of the first millennium. King Edgar the Peaceful of England is traditionally recorded to have demanded, in 957, three hundred wolf pelts from the kingdoms of north and south Wales. This is first recorded in William of Malmesbury's Gesta Regum Anglorum. There is, however, no evidence of wolf hunts in early medieval Wales, or even Scotland. Wolves at that time were especially numerous in the districts bordering Wales, which were heavily-forested. Wolves had been driven from the south of England by the time of the Norman Conquest.

This imposition was maintained until the Norman conquest of England. At the time, several criminals, rather than being put to death, would be ordered to provide a certain number of wolf tongues annually. The monk Galfrid, whilst writing about the miracles of St Cuthbert seven centuries earlier, observed that wolves were so numerous in Northumbria that it was virtually impossible for even the richest flock-masters to protect their sheep, despite employing many men for the job. The Anglo-Saxon Chronicle states that the month of January was known as "Wolf monath", as this was the first full month of wolf-hunting by the nobility. Officially, this hunting season would end on 25 March; thus it encompassed the cubbing season when wolves were at their most vulnerable, and their fur was of greater quality.

The Norman kings (reigning 1066-1154) employed servants as wolf hunters and many held lands granted on condition that they fulfilled this duty. William the Conqueror granted the lordship of Riddesdale in Northumberland to Robert de Umfraville on condition that he defend that land from enemies and wolves. There were no restrictions on or penalties for the hunting of wolves, except in royal game reserves, under the reasoning that the temptation for a commoner to shoot a deer there would be too great.

English wolves were more often trapped than hunted. Indeed, the Wolfhunt family, who resided in Peak forest in the 13th century, would march into the forest in March and December, and place pitch in the areas that wolves frequented. At that time of year, wolves would have had greater difficulty in smelling the pitch than at others. During the dry summers, they would enter the forest to kill cubs. Gerald of Wales wrote of how wolves in Holywell ate the corpses resulting from Henry II’s punitive expedition to Wales in 1165.

King John gave a premium of 5 shillings for the capture of two wolves. King Edward I, who reigned from 1272 to 1307, ordered the total extermination of all wolves in his kingdom and personally employed one Peter Corbet, with instructions to destroy wolves in the counties of Gloucestershire, Herefordshire, Worcestershire, Shropshire and Staffordshire - areas near to and including some of the Welsh Marches, where wolves were more common than in the southern areas of England.

In the 43rd year of Edward III's rule, a Thomas Engaine held lands in Pytchley in the county of Northampton, on the condition that he find special hunting dogs to kill wolves in the counties of Northampton, Rutland, Oxford, Essex and Buckingham. In the 11th year of Henry VI's reign (1433), a Sir Robert Plumpton held a bovate of land called "Wolf hunt land" in Nottingham, by service of winding a horn and chasing or frightening the wolves in Sherwood Forest. The wolf is generally thought to have become extinct in England during the reign of Henry VII (1485–1509), or at least very rare. By this time, wolves had become limited to the Lancashire forests of Blackburnshire and Bowland, the wilder parts of the Derbyshire Peak District, and the Yorkshire Wolds. Indeed, wolf bounties were still maintained in the East Riding until the early 19th century.

== Scotland ==
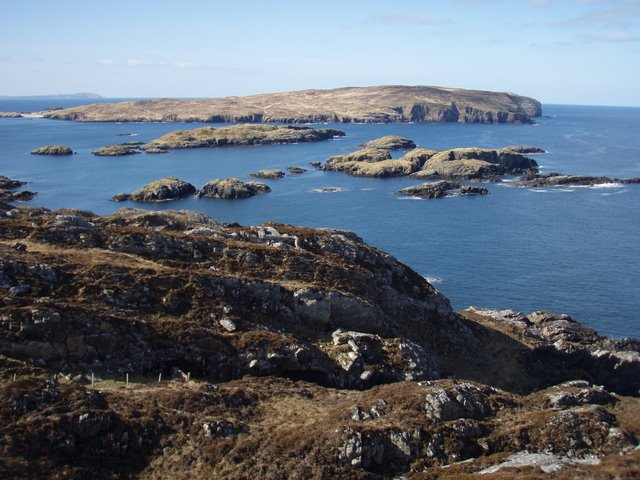
Handa Island, Sutherland, where locals once buried their dead to prevent their graves from being desecrated by wolves.

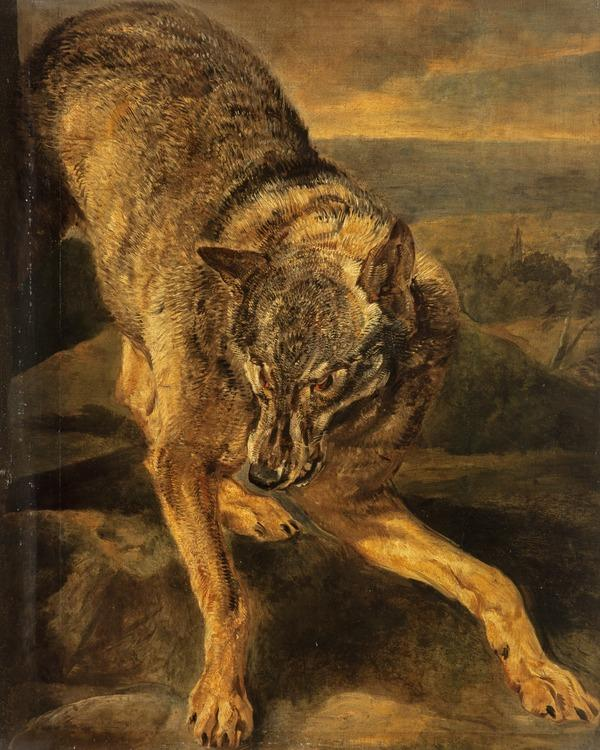
A Wolf by Jan Fyt, National Galleries of Scotland.

Wolves in Scotland during the reign of James VI (1567-1603) were considered such a threat to travellers that special houses called spittals were erected on the highways for protection. In Sutherland, wolves dug up graves so frequently that the inhabitants of Eddrachillis resorted to burying their dead on the island of Handa.

On Ederachillis’ shore
The grey wolf lies in wait-
Woe to the broken door,
Woe to the loosened gate,
And the groping wretch whom sleety fogs
On the trackless moor belate.

The lean and hungry wolf,
With his fangs so sharp and white,
His starveling body pinched
By the frost of a northern night,
And his pitiless eyes that scare the dark
With their green and threatening light.

[…]

He climbeth the guarding dyke,
He leapeth the hurdle bars,
He steals the sheep from the pen,
And the fish from the boat-house spars;
And he digs the dead from out the sod,
And gnaws them under the stars.

[…]

Thus every grave we dug
The hungry wolf uptore,
And every morn the sod
Was strewn with bones and gore;
Our mother earth had denied us rest
On Ederachillis’ shore.

— A Book of Highland Minstrelsy, 1846, pp. 256-258

Island burial was a practice also adopted on Tanera Mòr and on Inishail, while in Atholl, coffins were made wolf-proof by building them out of five flagstones. Wolves probably became extinct in the Scottish Lowlands during the thirteenth to fifteenth centuries, when immense tracts of forest were cleared. James I passed a law in 1427 requiring three wolf hunts a year between 25 April and 1 August, coinciding with the wolf's cubbing season. Scottish wolf-populations reached a peak during the second half of the 16th century. Mary, Queen of Scots is known to have hunted wolves in the forest of Atholl in 1563. The wolves later caused such damage to the cattle herds of Sutherland that in 1577, James VI made it compulsory to hunt wolves three times a year.

=== The last wolf in Scotland ===
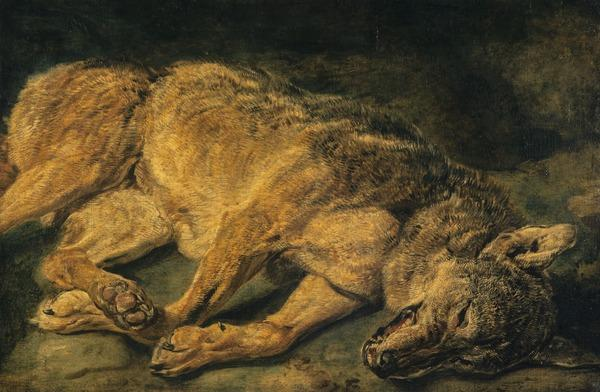
A Dead Wolf - Jan Fyt

Stories of the killing of the last wolf in Scotland vary. Official records indicate that the last Scottish wolf was killed by Sir Ewen Cameron of Lochiel in 1680 in Killiecrankie (Perthshire). However some claimed that wolves survived in Scotland up until the 18th century, and a tale even exists of one being seen as late as 1888.

== Folklore and literature ==
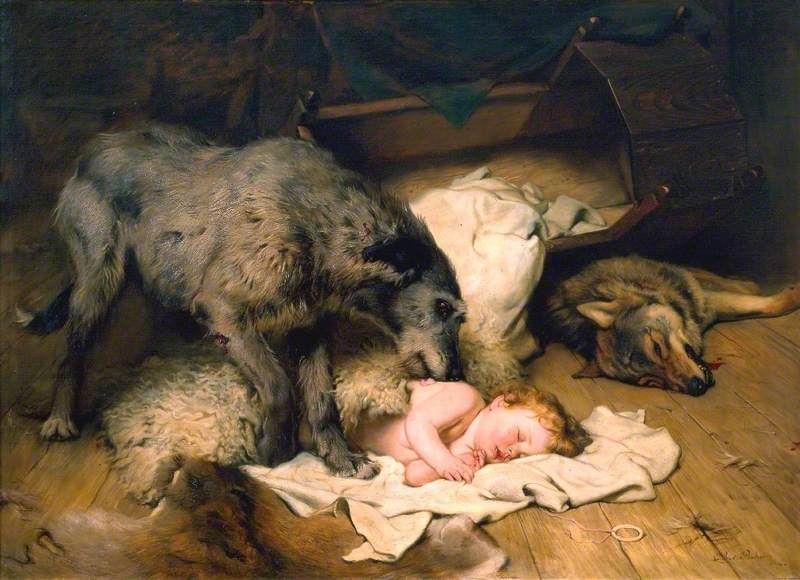
Gelert by Charles Burton Barber (1845-1894).

In the Welsh tale of Gelert, Llywelyn the Great, Prince of Gwynedd, killed his faithful wolfhound Gelert after finding him covered in blood which he presumed belonged to his baby son. Only later does he discover that his son is still alive and that the blood belonged to a wolf which Gelert killed in defense of the young prince. In Welsh mythology, St. Ciwa the "Wolf-Girl", and, in Irish mythology, Bairre (an ancestor of Amergin Glúingel) are said to have been suckled by wolves.

Scottish folklore tells of how an old man in Morayshire named MacQueen of Findhorn killed the last wolf in 1743.

== Fossil-finds ==
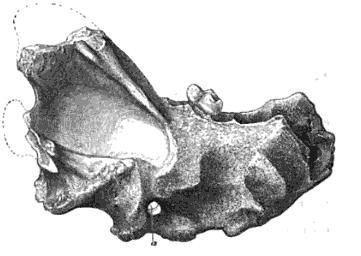
Illustration of the diseased jawbone of a young wolf from Oreston.

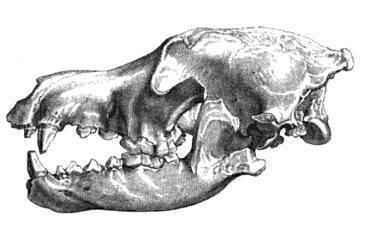
Illustration of a wolf skull excavated from Kents Cavern.

Wolf remains in the Kirkdale Cave, North Yorkshire, were noted to be scanty when compared with the prominence of cave hyena bones. Cuvier later pointed out that the number of wolf bones in Kirkdale was even lower than originally thought, as a lot of teeth first referred to as belonging to wolves turned out to be those of juvenile hyenas. The few positively identified wolf remains were thought to have been transported to the cave system by hyenas for consumption. William Buckland, in his Reliquiae Diluvianae, wrote that he only found one molar tooth which could be positively identified as being that of a wolf, while other bone fragments were indistinguishable from those of domestic dogs.

In the Paviland limestone caves of the Gower Peninsula in south Wales, the jaw, a heel bone and several metatarsals were found of a large canid, though it was impossible to definitively prove that they belonged to a wolf rather than a large dog.

In a series of caves discovered in a quarry in Oreston, Plymouth, a Mr Whidbey found several bones and teeth of a species of canis indistinguishable from modern wolves. Richard Owen examined a jaw bone excavated from Oreston, which he remarked was from a subadult animal with evidence of having been enlarged by exostosis and ulceration, probably due to a fight with another wolf. The other bones showed evidence of having been gnawed by small animals, and many were further damaged by workmen in their efforts to extricate them from the clay. Unlike those of the Kirkdale wolves, the Oreston remains showed no evidence of having been gnawed on by hyenas.

An almost entire skull with missing teeth was discovered in Kents Cavern, Devon, by a Mr Mac Enery. The skull was exactly equal in size to that of an Arctic wolf, the only notable differences being that the sectorial molar was slightly larger and the lower border of the jaw was more convex. It was positively identified as being that of a wolf by its low and contracted forehead.

== Proposed reintroduction to Scotland and England ==
In 1999, Dr Martyn Gorman, senior lecturer in zoology at Aberdeen University and vice chairman of the UK Mammal Society called for a reintroduction of wolves to the Scottish Highlands and English countryside in order to deal with the then 350,000 red deer damaging young trees in commercial forests. Scottish National Heritage considered re-establishing carefully controlled colonies of wolves but shelved the idea following an outcry from sheep farmers.

In 2002, Paul van Vlissingen, a wealthy landowner at Letterewe, Achnasheen, Ross-shire, in the western Highlands, proposed the reintroduction of both wolves and lynxes to Scotland and England, stating that current deer-culling methods were inadequate and that wolves would boost the Scottish tourist industry.

In 2007, British and Norwegian researchers including experts from the Imperial College London said that wolf reintroduction into the Scottish Highlands and English countryside would aid in the re-establishment of plants and birds currently hampered by the deer population. Their study also assessed people's attitudes toward the idea of releasing wolves into the wild. While the public was generally positive, people living in rural areas were more sensitive, though they were open to the idea provided that they would be reimbursed for livestock losses.

Richard Morley, of the Wolves and Humans Foundation (formerly the Wolf Society of Great Britain), forecast in 2007 that public support for wolf reintroduction would grow over the next 15 years, though he criticized previous talks as being too "simple or romantic". He stated that although wolves would be good for tourism, farmers and crofters had serious concerns about the effect that wolves could have on their livestock, particularly sheep, that had to be acknowledged.

Although as of 2017 the prospect of reintroducing wolves and other large carnivores in the Highlands of Scotland remains highly controversial, there are some who are already making plans for reintroductions. Paul Lister is the laird of Alladale Estate in the Caledonian Forest of North Scotland, and he has plans to reintroduce large carnivores into his wildlife reserves, such as wolves, lynx, and bears. Many of the arguments against this kind of reintroduction are due to the potential impacts these animals could have on farming, but Lister argues that this would not be a problem in Alladale as there is very little farming in the area that could be affected. This type of reintroduction could be beneficial for the economy and ecology of the UK, just as it has in the US. In 1995, wolves were reintroduced into Yellowstone National Park, which transformed the ecology of the area, allowing forests to regenerate and biodiversity to increase. Wolf-related tourism also brings $35.5 million annually to Wyoming.

== See also ==
- Wolves in Ireland
- List of extinct animals of the British Isles
- List of gray wolf populations by country
