= Wolves in Ireland =

Extirpation of Irish wolves

Legend of Priest and Were-Wolves from Gerald de Barri's Topographia Hibernica.

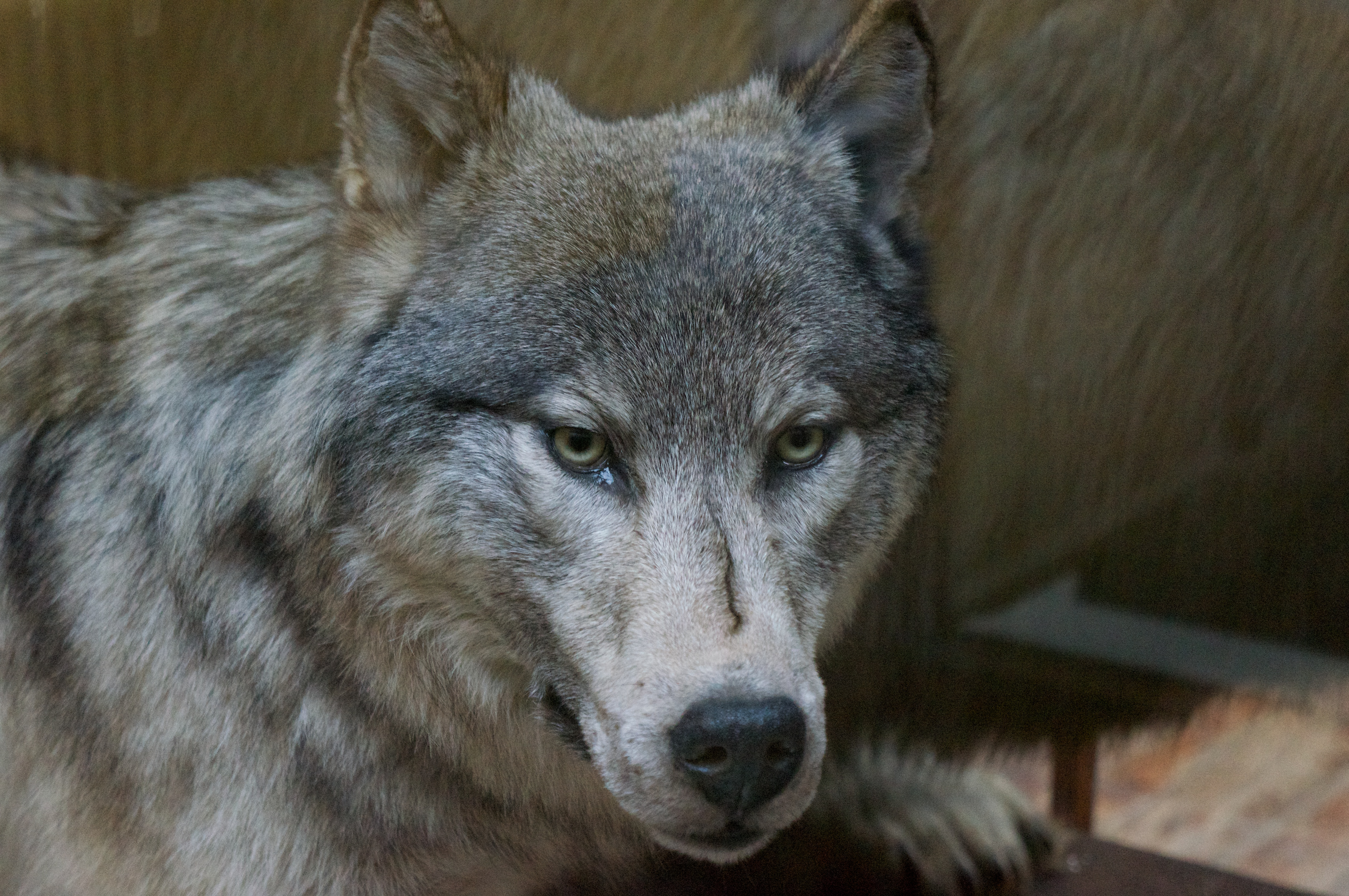
Preserved wolf in the National Museum of Ireland – Natural History

The Eurasian wolf (Canis lupus lupus) was an integral part of the Irish countryside and culture, but is now extirpated. The last wild wolf in Ireland is said to have been killed in 1786, 300 years after they were believed to have been wiped out in England and 100 years after their disappearance from Scotland.

== Folklore and mythology ==
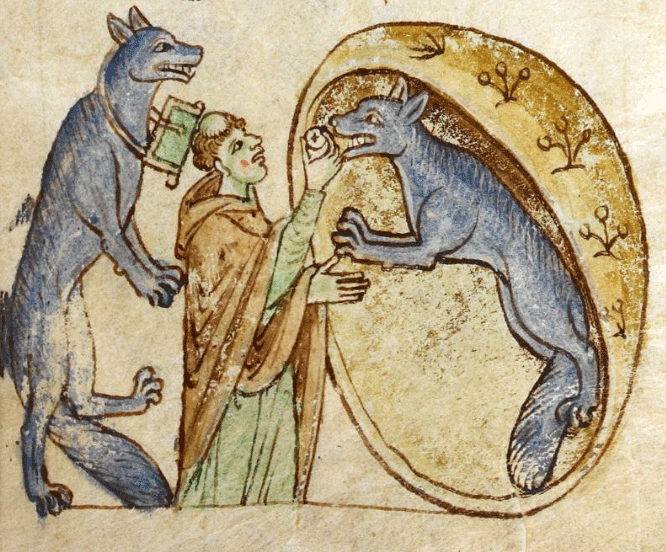
Depiction of the Werewolves of Ossory, from Topographia Hibernica by Gerald of Wales, c. 1200

Wolves feature prominently in Irish mythology. Airitech was a mysterious creature whose three daughters were werewolf-like creatures, eventually killed by Cas Corach. The Irish words for wolf are Mac Tíre ("son of the land"), Faoil (from Proto-Indo-European *waylos, "howler") and Cú Allaidh ("wild hound"), and association with human transformation linger. Whilst some consider this to be imported, there are many references in Irish mythology to lycanthropes and changing to other animal forms. The last known wolf in Ireland was killed near Mount Leinster in 1786.

The Morrígan was said to take on the form of a red-furred wolf, particularly in her battle with the hero Cú Chulainn. Mac Cecht killed a wolf feeding on a still-living woman on a battlefield. Cormac mac Airt was said to have been raised by wolves, and that he could understand their speech. Four wolves would accompany him in his rebellion against Lugaid mac Con, and he would later be accompanied by them until the end of his life.

The Annals of the Four Masters claims that, in 690, "It rained a shower of blood in Leinster this year. Butter was there also turned into lumps of gore and blood, so that it was manifest to all in general. The wolf was heard speaking with human voice, which was horrific to all."

One tale describes how in 1182, a priest travelling from Ulster into Meath encountered a talking wolf, which revealed itself to be a man of Ossory, whose ancestors had been cursed to turn into wolves every seven years and return to their human form after another seven years had passed. The wolf explained that his wife, who was also under the curse, was dying, and he pleaded with the priest to give her the viaticum. The priest complied, and was later put on the right road to Meath by the grateful wolf.

== History ==
=== In prehistory ===
The Eurasian wolf (Canis lupus lupus) is a canine of the order Carnivora, a subspecies of the grey wolf (Canis lupus), and an apex predator largely feeding on ungulates.

The earliest radiocarbon date for Irish wolf remains come from excavated cave sites in Castlepook Cave, north of Doneraile, County Cork, and dates back to 34,000 BC. Wolf bones discovered in a number of other cave sites, particularly in the counties of Cork, Waterford and Clare indicate the presence of wolves throughout the Midlandian ice age which probably reached its peak between 20,000 BC and 18,000 BC.

By about 14,000 BC, Ireland became separated from Great Britain, which, itself, still formed part of mainland Europe, to become an island. Wolves were one of just a few species of land animal in Ireland that survived through the Nahanagan Stadial, a cold period that occurred between 10,800 BC and 9500 BC.

Wolves were a major part of Ireland's postglacial fauna, as evidenced by their prominence in ancient Irish myths and legends, in a number of place names (both Irish and English), in archaeological sites, along with a considerable number of historical references.

=== Historical records ===
The mapped locations of wolf place-names in Ireland. When the map is opened, the markers with details are selectable.

According to the Annals of Loch Cé, the poet Cúán úa Lothcháin (died 1024) was "slain by the men of Tethfa. God performed a ‘poet's miracle,' manifestly, on the party that killed him, for they died an evil death, and their bodies were not buried until wolves and birds preyed upon them."

One of the earliest historic references to wolves attacking people in Ireland occurs in the Annals of Tigernach under the year 1137: "The Blind one of ... that is, Giolla Muire, was killed by wolves."

Under the year 1420 in the Annála Connacht is the statement "Wolves killed many people this year."

In 1571, as a result of its comprehensive destruction by James Mac Maurice and "the warlike troops of the Clann-Sweeny and Clann-Sheehy", Kilmallock "became the receptacle and abode of wolves" In 1573, the aftermath of the battle of Bel-an-Chip was described—"Noisy were the ravens and carrion-crows, and other ravenous birds of the air, and the wolves of the forest, over the bodies of the nobles slain in the battle on that day." In 1581 William Odhar O Carroll was put "unsparingly to the sword, and detested (the thought of) shewing him quarter or mercy. They slew him, and left his body under the talons of ravens and the claws of wolves." In the aftermath of the Desmond rebellion, the body of a Dr. Saunders was found in Desmond in early 1583 "who perished miserably, having fallen a victim to famine and the effects of exposure to the weather, and whose body was discovered partially devoured by wolves" In the aftermath of the wreck of the Spanish Armada in 1588, Francisco de Cuellar turned to check upon a companion only to find him dead. "There he lay on the ground with more than six hundred other dead bodies which the sea cast up, and the crows and wolves devoured them, without there being any one to bury them."

The port books of Bristol record between a yearly average of between 100 and 300 wolfskins exported from Ireland throughout the 1500s and a total of 961 skins in a single year. Pilib Ó Súilleabháin Béirre (c. 1590 – c. 1660), writing of Ireland and particularly Munster after the end of the Nine Years' War, described the aftermath: "THUS the war was finished. Ireland was almost entirely laid waste and destroyed, and terrible want and famine oppressed all, so that many were forced to eat dogs and whelps: many not having even these, died. And not only men but even beasts were hungry. The wolves, coming out of the woods and mountains, attacked and tore to pieces, men weak from want. The dogs rooted from the graves rotten carcases partly decomposed. And so there was nought but abundance of misery ..."

Throughout most of the first half of the 17th century, Ireland had a substantial wolf population of not less than 400 and maybe as high as 1,000 wolves at any one time. One of the nicknames used for Ireland at this time was “wolf-land”.

=== Extermination ===
The first instance of legislation against Irish wolves dates back to 1584 when John Perrot, the Lord Deputy of Ireland, ordered Robert Legge to come up with a scheme to encourage the destruction of problem wolves. Further records of legislation occur in 1610 and 1611. In 1614, an Englishman named Henric Tuttesham was offered £3 for every wolf that he killed. The wolf population at the time was high enough for Tuttesham to be authorised to keep four men and 24 hounds in every county for seven years, a total of 128 men and 768 hounds.

The bulk of anti-wolf legislation occurred during the decade following the Cromwellian conquest of Ireland. A number of writers from this time period suggest that as a result of ongoing military campaigns in Ireland, particularly the Cromwellian wars of 1641–1652 and the devastation of much of the country and, with increasing numbers of farmed animals, wolf numbers were increasing and seen as a threat to business.

The level of rewards and bounties established by Oliver Cromwell's regime attracted a few professional wolf hunters to Ireland, mostly from England. Politically, the prospect of numbers of armed Irish roaming around the country hunting wolves was not acceptable, given the ongoing conflict between the Irish and the new English settlers, so it was seen as much safer for the English authorities to encourage men from their own country to deal with the wolf problem. The problems caused by wolves were considered serious enough by Cromwell's government to impose a ban on the exportation of Irish Wolfhounds.

In 1652 the Commissioners of the Revenue of Cromwell's Irish Government set substantial bounties on wolves, £6 for a female, £5 for a male, £2 for a subadult and 10 shillings for a pup. In the same year, measures were taken for the destruction of wolves in the Barony of Castleknock, county Dublin. A grand total of £243 5s 4d was paid for wolf kills in counties Galway, Mayo, Sligo and part of Leitrim formerly within the precinct of Galway in 1655 or 1665, depending on the author.

Between the period July 1649 and November 1656 the total amount of bounty paid out for wolf kills in Ireland as a whole was £3,847 5s. Galway, Mayo, Sligo and part of Leitrim had proportionately more wolves than the rest of the country, given that large tracts of this area were relatively untouched by humans. A Captain Edward Piers was leased land over a five-year period in Dunboyne, County Meath on the condition that he kill 14 wolves and 60 foxes. In the 1690s Rory Carragh was hired to kill the last two wolves in one part of Ulster and was equipped with a boy and two wolf dogs. The last reliable observation of a wolf in Ireland comes from County Carlow when a wolf was hunted down and killed near Mount Leinster for killing sheep in 1786.

=== Reintroduction ===
Captive wolves currently reside at the Wild Ireland wildlife park on the Inishowen Peninsula. They have also been hosted at Dublin Zoo, with a special extended area made in the late 2010s, but are not currently accommodated there.

In 2019, Green Party leader Eamon Ryan called for the reintroduction of wolves to help rewild the countryside and control deer numbers; however the Minister for Culture, Heritage and the Gaeltacht, Josepha Madigan, has stated that her department currently has no plans to do so.

== See also ==
- Irish Wolfhound
- Wolves in Great Britain
- Bears in Ireland
- List of European species extinct in the Holocene
- List of gray wolf populations by country

== Bibliography ==
- Allen, F.A. (1909) The wolf in Scotland and Ireland, Transactions of the Caradoc and Severn Valley Field Club, (5), 68–74.
- Archibald, C. and Bell, J. (1854) Wolves in Ireland, Ulster Journal of Archaeology, 1(2), 281. "the last wolf seen in Ireland was killed at a place called Glenelly, by a mare in defence of her foal!"
- Barnard, T.C. (1975) Cromwellian Ireland English Government and Reform in Ireland 1649-1660. Oxford: Oxford University Press.
- Broghill, Lord (1874) Wolves, Two letters from Lord Broghill to the Earl of Dorset. Historic Manuscripts Commission Report (De LaWarr Manuscripts), 4, 280.
- Cabot, D. (1999) Ireland : A Natural History. London: Harper Collins Publishers.
- Croaffts, C. (1909) Wolves, Two letters from Christopher Croaffts to Sir John Perceval. Historic Manuscripts Commission Report (Egmont Manuscripts), 2, 5.
- Dixon, D. (2000) New Foundations Ireland 1660-1800, 2nd Edition. Dublin: Irish Academic Press.
- Dunlop, R. (1913) Ireland under the Commonwealth. Manchester: Manchester University Press.
- Fairley, J. (1984) An Irish Beast Book: A Natural History of Ireland's Furred Wildlife. Belfast: The Blackstaff Press.
- Federal Database On Wildlife (1998) Biological data and habitat requirements. Website: http://www.fs.fed.us/database/feis/animals.
- Feehan, J. (1997) The heritage of the rocks, In: Foster, J.W. (ed.) Nature in Ireland: a scientific and cultural history. Dublin: The Lilliput Press, 3-22.
- Flanagan, L.N.W. (1979) An index to minor place-names from the 6" Ordnance Survey: Co. Derry, Bulletin of the Ulster Place-Name Society, 2(2), 42.
- Foster, J.W. (ed.) (1997a) Nature in Ireland: a scientific and cultural history. Dublin: The Lilliput Press Ltd.
- Foster, J.W. (1997b) Nature and nation in the nineteenth century, In: Foster, J.W. (ed.) Nature in Ireland: a scientific and cultural history. Dublin: The Lilliput Press, 409–439.
- Harting, J.E. (1880) British Animals extinct within historic times with some account of British wild white cattle. London: Trubner and Co. Page 185
- O'Flaherty, R. (1846) A chorographical description of West or H-Iar Connaught. Dublin: Irish Archaeology Society. Page 10. "The last wolf which I have been able to trace here was killed in the mountains of Joyce-country, in the year 1700."
- MacLysaght, E. (1979) Irish life in the seventeenth century. Dublin: Irish Academic Press Limited. Extermination of the Irish wolf 197–198. Hickey.
- McCracken, E. (1971) The Irish woods since Tudor times: Distribution and exploitation. Belfast: Institute of Irish Studies.
- Moffat, C.B. (1938) The mammals of Ireland, Proceedings of the Royal Irish Academy, 44B, 61–128.
- Moriarty, C. (1997) The early naturalists, In: Foster, J.W. (ed.) Nature in Ireland: a scientific and cultural history. Dublin: The Lilliput Press, 71–90.
- O'Sullivan, S. (ed.) (1966) Folktales of Ireland. London: Routledge.
- Pender, S. (ed.) (1939) A Census of Ireland c. 1659 with supplementary material from the poll money ordinances (1660–1661). Dublin: Stationery Office.
- Pickering, D. (1998) Dictionary of Superstitions. London: Brockhampton Press.
- Prendergast, J.P. (1922) The Cromwellian Settlement of Ireland. 3rd edition. Dublin: Mellifont Press.
- Raftery, B. (1994) Pagan Celtic Ireland: The enigma of the Irish Iron Age. London: Thames and Hudson.
- Richardson, H. D. (8 May 1841). "The Irish Wolf-Dog". Irish Penny Journal. I (45): 353. - "a wolf was killed in the Wicklow mountains so recently as 1770".
- Scharff, R.F. (1922) The Wolf in Ireland, The Irish Naturalist, 31, 133–136.
- Scharff, R.F. (1924) The Wolf in Ireland, The Irish Naturalist, 33, 95.
- Scharff, R.F., Seymour, H.J. and Newton, E.T. (1918) Exploration of Castlepook Cave, Co. Cork, Proceedings of the Royal Irish Academy, 34B, 33–72.
- Scouler, John (1838). "Notice of animals which have disappeared from Ireland during the period of authentic history". Journal of the Geological Society of Dublin. I: 224. "[T]he wolf was at last extirpated about the year 1710."
- Sleeman, P. (1997) Mammals and mammalogy, In: Foster, J.W. (ed.) Nature in Ireland: a scientific and cultural history. Dublin: The Lilliput Press, 241–261.
- Stuart, A.J. and Van Wijngaarden-Bakker, L.H. (1985) Quaternary Vertebrates, In: Edwards K.J. and Warren W. (eds) The Quaternary History of Ireland. London: Academic Press, 221–249.
- Thompson, W. (1849) The natural history of Ireland. London : Reeve, Benham and Reeve, 33. "Three places in Ireland are commemorated, each as having had the last Irish wolf killed there, viz. one in the south; another near Glenarm; and the third (Wolfhill) three miles from Belfast."
- Waddell, J. (1998) The prehistoric archaeology of Ireland. Galway: Galway University Press.
