= Fauna of Ireland =

Animal species of the island of Ireland and surrounding waters

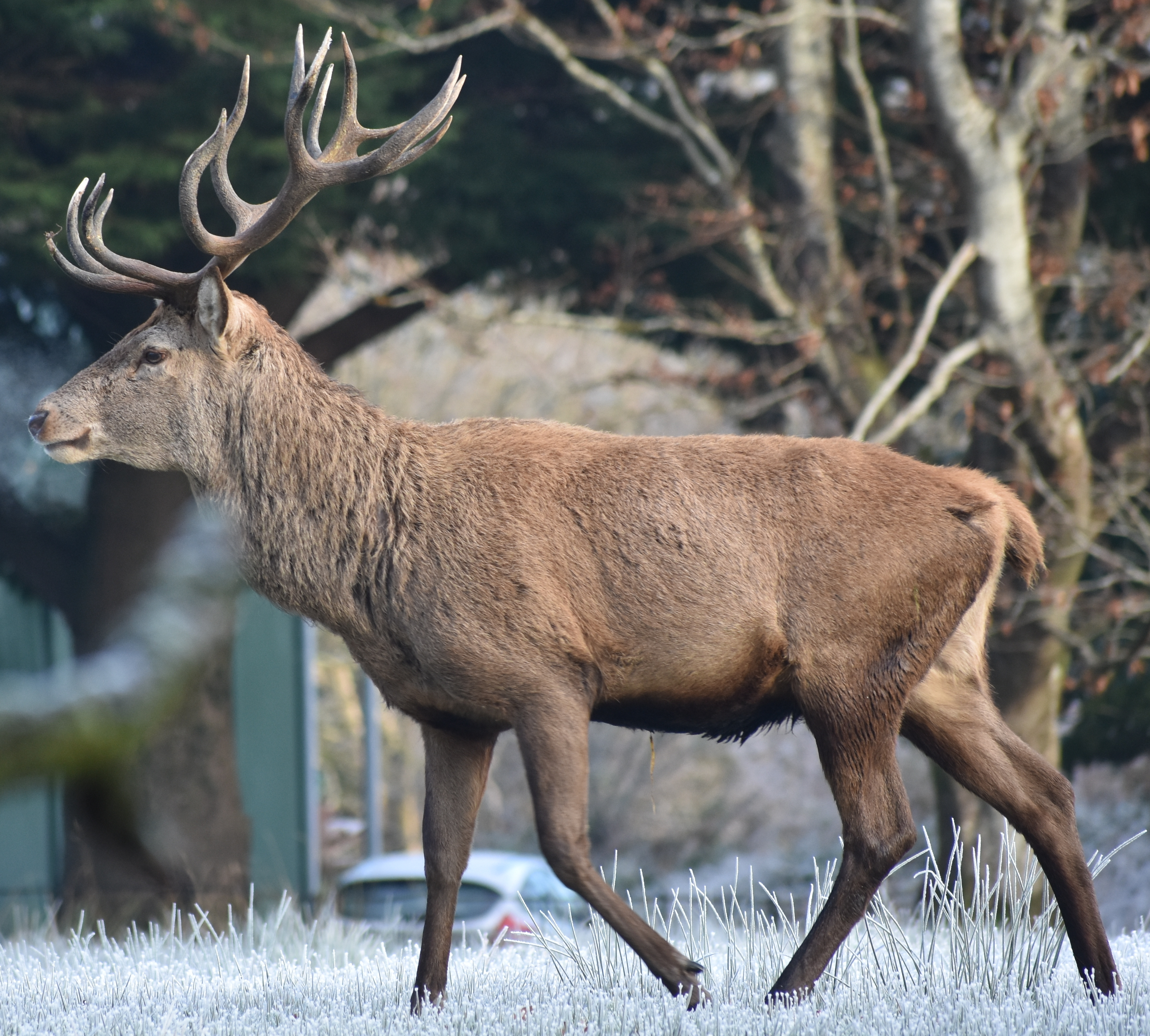
The red deer is Ireland's largest wild mammal and could be considered its national animal. A stag appeared on the old £1 coin

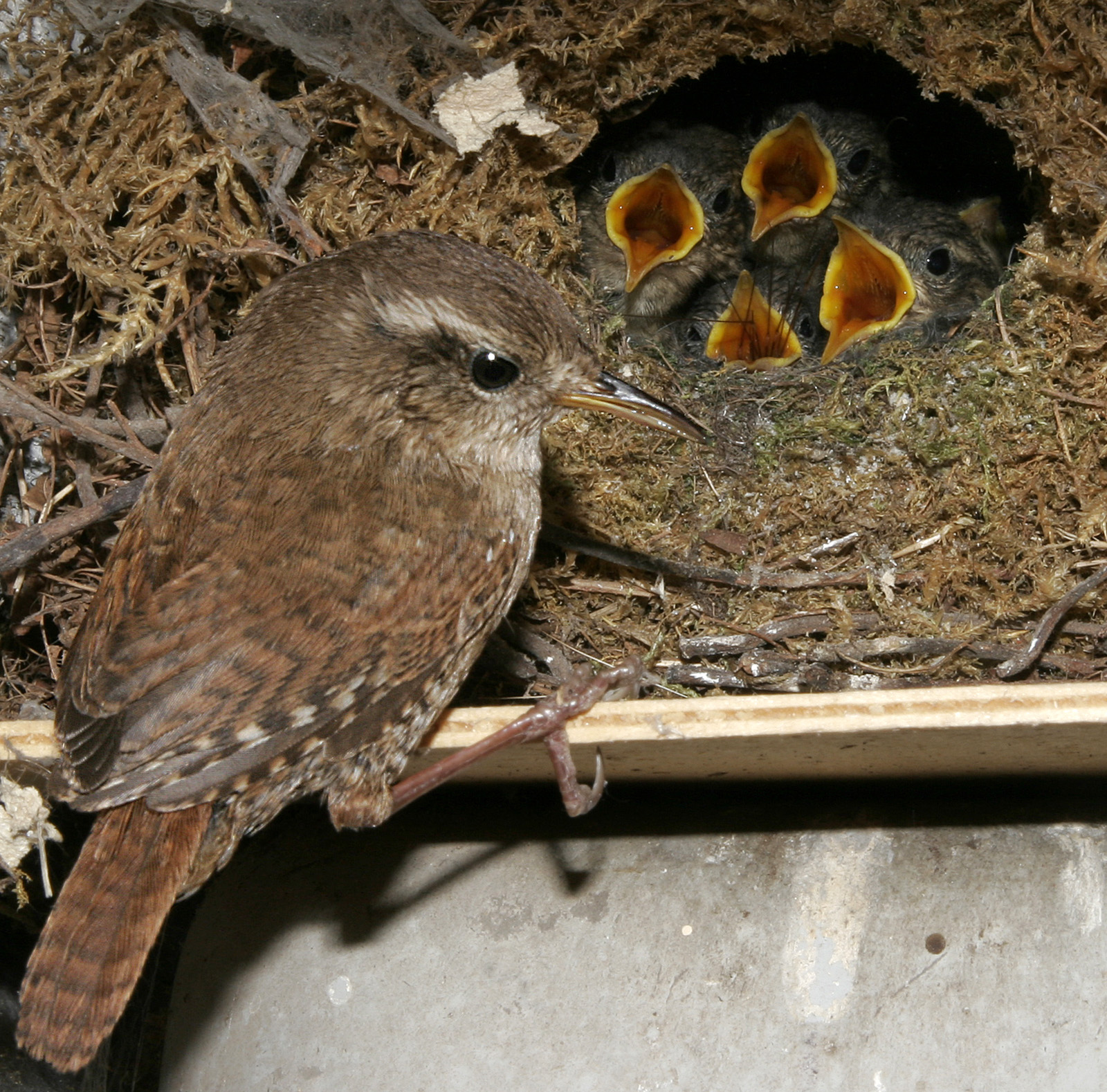
The wren enjoys an exalted position as "King of All Birds" in Irish folklore, but is the villain in the tale of Saint Stephen

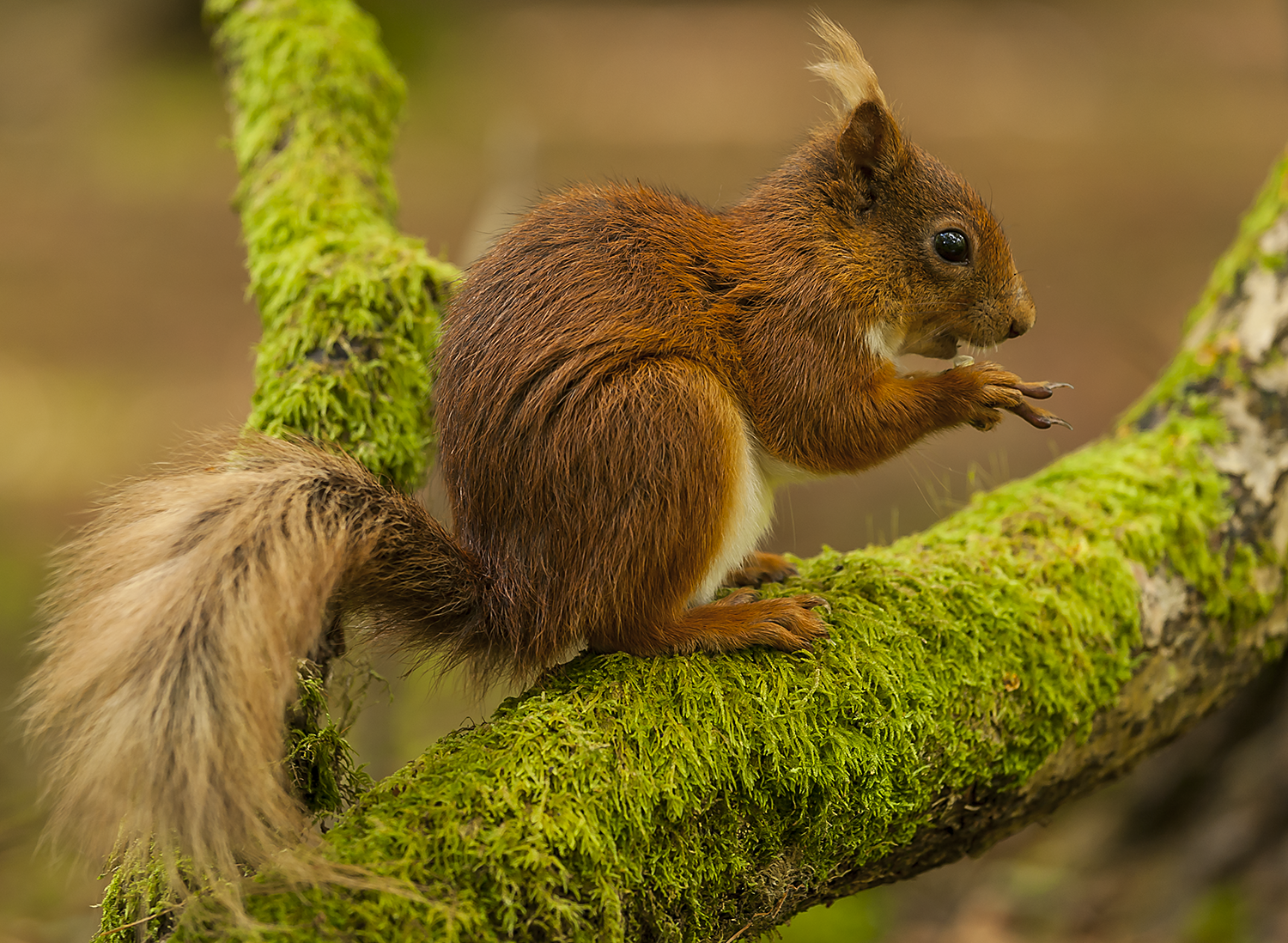
Red squirrel in County Donegal. Native red squirrels in Ireland and Britain have lighter tails and ears than the rest of their body. 43% of red squirrels in Ireland are non-native red squirrels from mainland Europe which do not have this trait

The fauna of Ireland comprises all animal species inhabiting the island of Ireland and its surrounding waters. In 2008, the National Parks and Wildlife Service estimated that there were at least 19,122 species of fauna in Ireland, most of which are arthropods.

== Summary ==
This table uses figures supplied by the National Parks and Wildlife Service.

Phylum	Class	Species	List
Porifera	Calcarea, Demospongiae, Homoscleromorpha	290	(list)
Cnidaria	Anthozoa (sea anemones, soft coral); Hydrozoa (hydroids and siphonophores); Scyphozoa (true sea jellies); Staurozoa (stalked sea jellies)	302	(list)
Chordata	Ascidiacea (sea squirts)	78	(list)
Chordata	Appendicularia (larvaceans)	9	(list)
Chordata	Thaliacea (pelagic tunicates)	11	(list)
Chordata	Hyperoartia (lampreys)	3	(list)
Chordata	Myxini (hagfish)	2	(list)
Chordata	Chondrichthyes (cartilaginous fish)	64	(list)
Chordata	Actinopterygii (ray-finned bony fish)	363	(list)
Chordata	Amphibia (amphibians)	3	(list)
Chordata	Reptilia (reptiles)	8 (Note: 2 terrestrial, 6 marine)	(list)
Chordata	Aves (birds)	444	(list)
Chordata	Mammalia (mammals)	53 (Note: 27 terrestrial, 26 marine)	(list)
Echinodermata	Asteroidea (sea stars); Crinoidea (feather stars); Echinoidea (sea urchins); Holothuroidea (sea cucumbers); Ophiuroidea (brittle stars)	192	(list)
Arthropoda	Crustacea (crustaceans)	1,774	(list)
Arthropoda	Arachnida (arachnids)	860	(list)
Arthropoda	Myriapoda (millipedes and centipedes)	74	(list)
Arthropoda	Insecta (insects)	11,260	(Note: beetles; butterflies; moths; dragonflies and damselflies; grasshoppers and bush-crickets; flies; Hymenoptera; bugs)
Mollusca		1,088	(list)
Annelida		404	(list)
Bryozoa	Gymnolaemata, Stenolaemata	206	(list)
Helminths		111	
Total >19,122

== Vertebrates ==
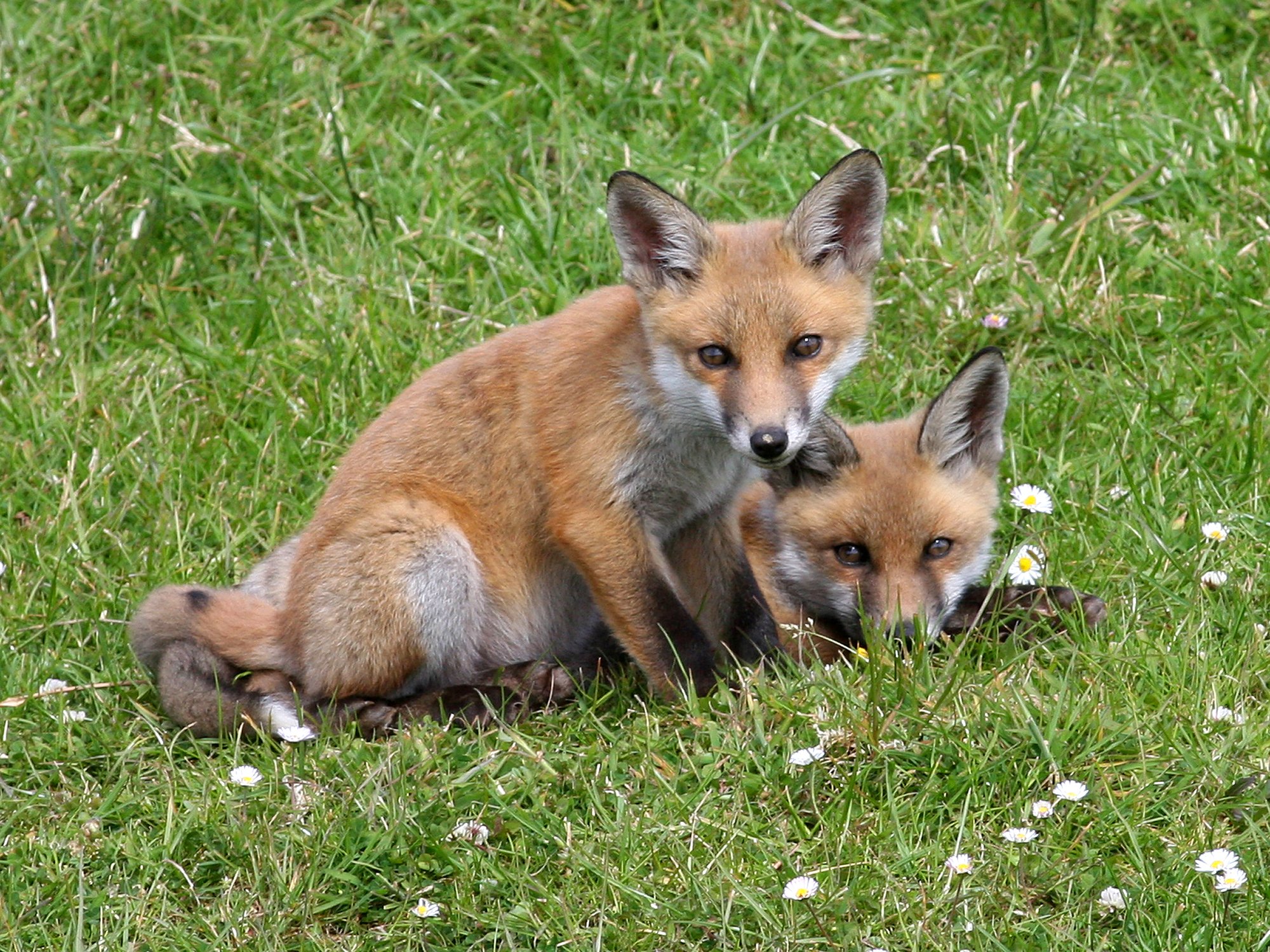
Red fox cubs in County Cork. Red foxes are the only canids native to Ireland

=== Mammals ===
Only 27 terrestrial mammal species (including bats, but not including marine mammals) are native to Ireland, because it has been isolated from the European mainland (by rising sea levels after the Midlandian Ice Age), since about 14,000 BC. Some species, such as the red fox, European hedgehog, stoat, otter, pygmy shrew, and badger are common, whereas others, like the Irish hare, red deer, and pine marten are less common and generally seen only in certain national parks and nature reserves around the island. Some introduced species have become thoroughly naturalised, e.g. the European rabbit, European fallow deer, and black rat. 9 species of bat are found in Ireland.

==== Extinct mammals ====
During the Last Glacial Period, mammals such as the woolly mammoth, muskox, wild horse, Irish elk (also known as the giant deer), brown bear, cave hyena, Arctic lemming, Arctic fox, wolf, and reindeer inhabited Ireland. Eurasian lynx remains are also known from some Holocene sites.

Irish brown bears are thought to have become extinct around 1000-500 BC. The last known Irish grey wolf was killed in 1786.

Excavations of Barbary macaque remains from the Iron Age (dating to around 390 BC-20 BC) indicate the species was artificially brought to Ireland at some point in the past.

=== Reptiles ===
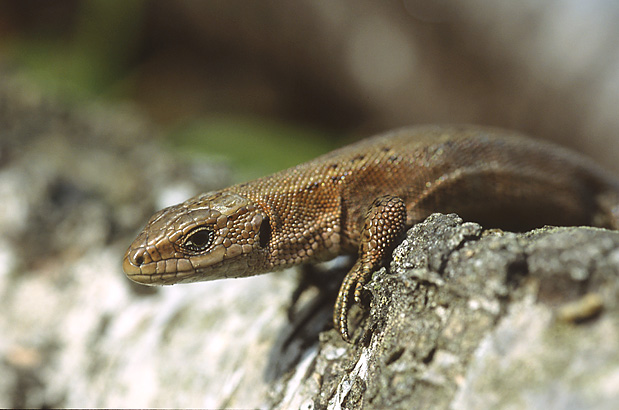
The viviparous lizard is the only land reptile native to Ireland

Only one land reptile is native to the country, the viviparous lizard. It is common in national parks, particularly in the Wicklow Mountains. Slowworms are common in parts of The Burren area in County Clare, but they are not a native species and were probably introduced in the 1970s. Five marine turtle species appear regularly off the west coast, the leatherback, green, hawksbill, loggerhead, and Kemp's ridley, but they very rarely come ashore.

Legend attributes the absence of snakes in Ireland to Saint Patrick, who is said to have banished them from the island, chasing them into the sea after they assailed him during a 40-day fast he was undertaking on top of a hill. In reality, no species of snake ever inhabited Ireland, due to it losing its land-bridge to Britain before snakes came north after the Ice Age.

=== Amphibians ===
Three amphibians are found in Ireland, the common European brown frog, the smooth newt, and the natterjack toad. There are questions over whether the frog is actually native to Ireland, with some historic accounts stating that the frog was introduced in the 18th century. The natterjack toad is only found in a few localised sites in County Kerry and western County Cork. For atlases see Atlases of the flora and fauna of Britain and Ireland. It reached Ireland sometime after the ice age.

=== Birds ===
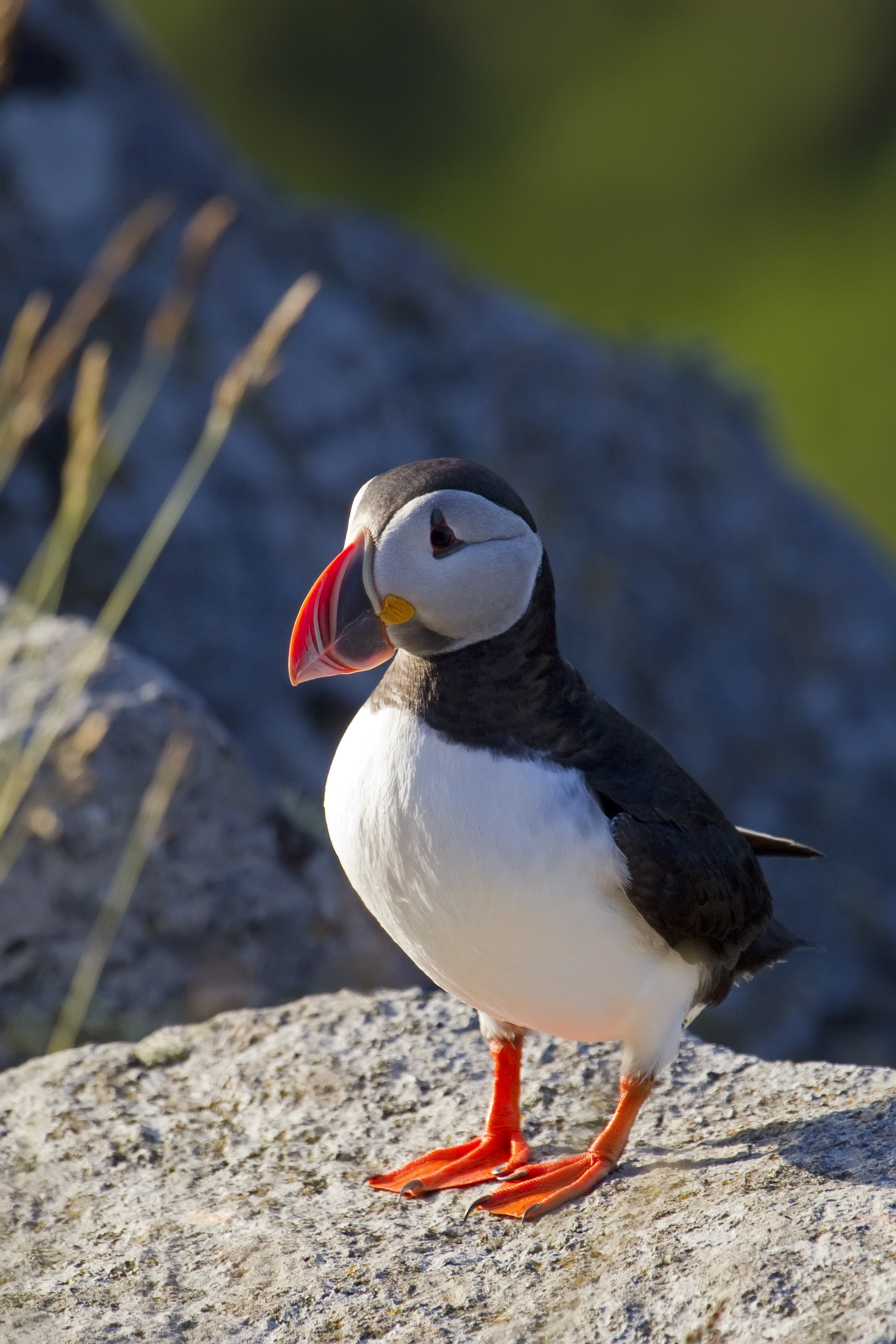
The Atlantic puffin is a migratory bird to Ireland, common at coastal areas

About 400 bird species have been recorded in Ireland. Many of these species are migratory. There are Arctic birds, which come in the winter, and birds such as the swallow, which come from Africa in the summer to breed. Many birds which are common residents in Britain and continental Europe are rare or unusual in Ireland, examples include the tawny owl, willow tit, marsh tit, nuthatch, and all woodpecker species except the recently established great spotted woodpecker. These are birds which do not move great distances and their absence may be due to Ireland's early isolation, but also Ireland's mild weather means early breeding and choice of best habitats which gives residents an advantage over visitors.

Although Ireland has fewer breeding species than Britain and Continental Europe (because there are fewer habitat types, fewer deciduous woodlands, Scots pine forests, heaths, and high mountain ranges), there are important populations of species that are in decline elsewhere. Storm petrels (largest breeding numbers in the world), roseate tern, chough, and corncrake. Four species of bird have Irish subspecies. These are the coal tit (Parus ater hibernicus), dipper (Cinclus cinclus hibernicus), jay (Garrulus glandarius hibernicus), and red grouse (Lagopus lagopus hibernicus).

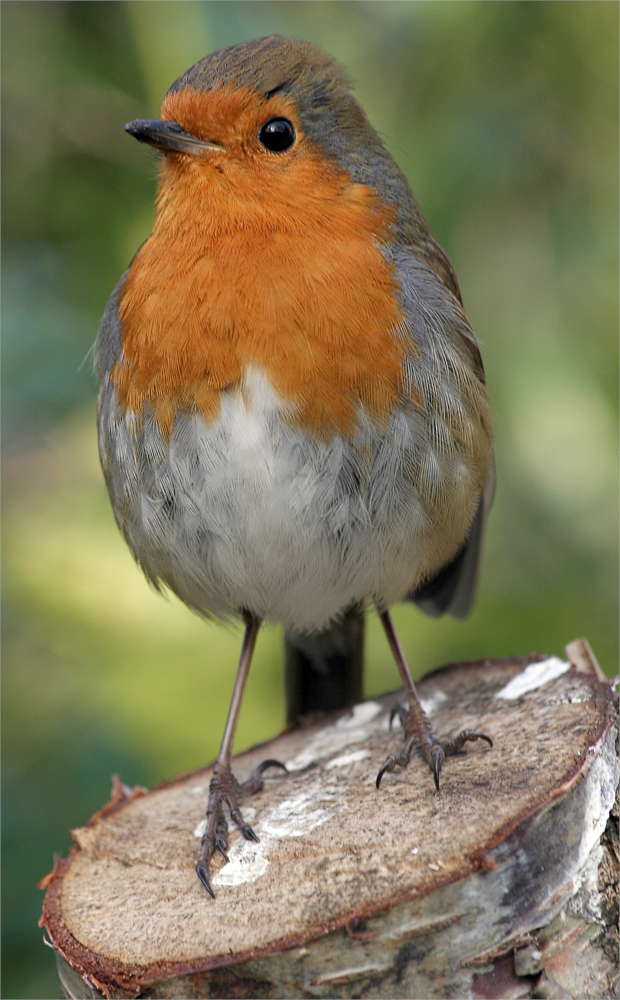
The European robin is a year-round resident in Ireland

The wren, robin, blackbird, and common chaffinch are the most widespread species, occurring in 90% of the land area. These and the rook, starling, great tit, and blue tit are among the most numerous and commonly seen. Over the period 1997–2007, populations of pigeons, warblers, tits, finches, and buntings have remained stable or shown an increase (there were massive declines during the 1970s). Kestrel, swift, skylark, and mistle thrush have continued to decline due to changes in agricultural practices such as increased use of pesticides and fertiliser. Climate change has also played a role. For atlases see Atlases of the flora and fauna of Britain and Ireland

Ireland has a rich marine avifauna, with many large seabird colonies dotted around its coastline such as those on the Saltee Islands, Skellig Michael, and the Copeland Islands. Also of note are golden eagles, recently reintroduced after decades of extinction (Golden Eagle Reintroduction Programme in County Donegal). Another conservation effort is habitat management to encourage the red-necked phalarope.

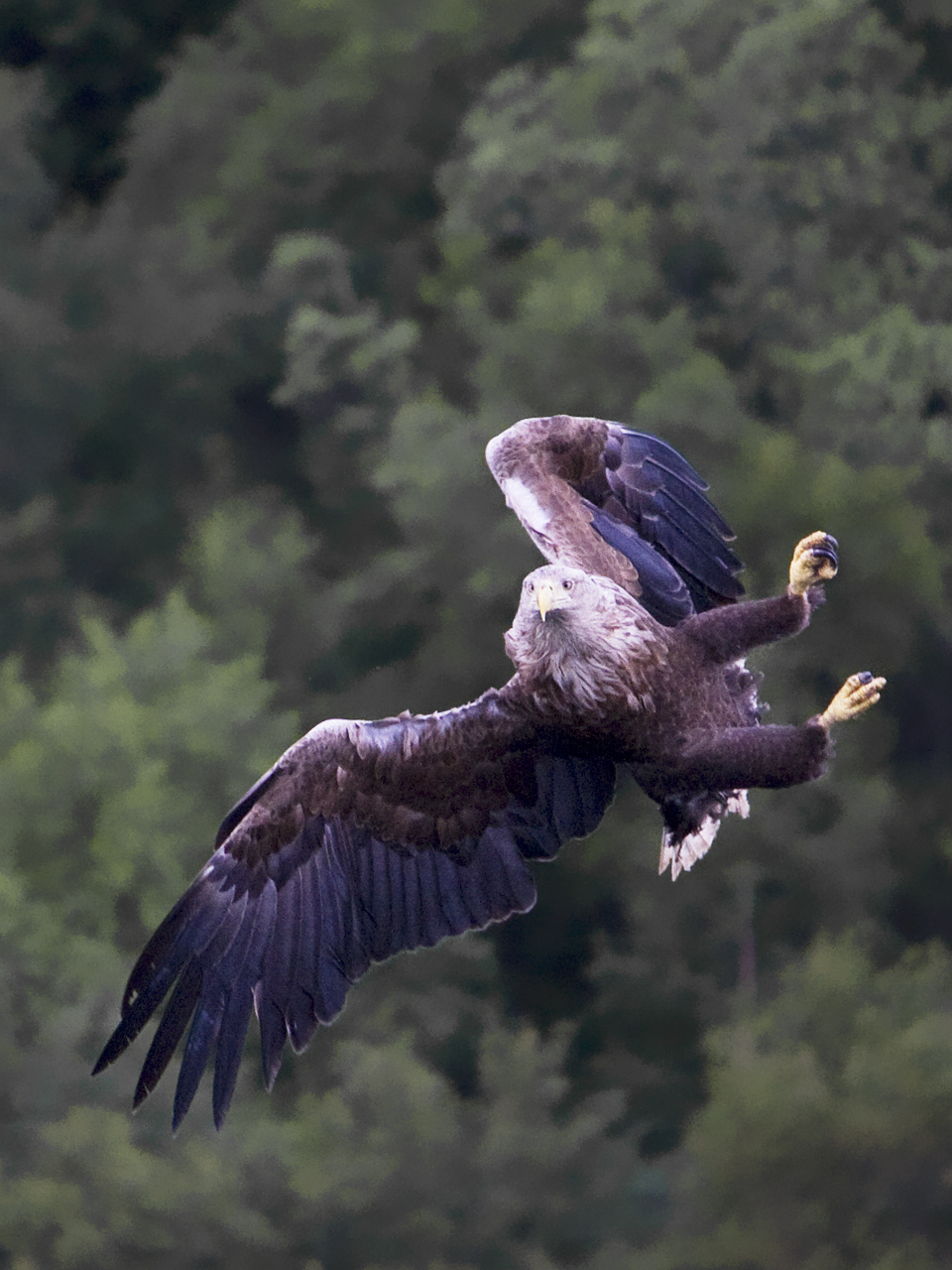
The white-tailed eagle, re-introduced in 2007 following a 200-year absence from Ireland

South-eastern Wexford is an important site for birds - the north side of Wexford Harbour, the North Slob, is home to 10,000 Greenland white-fronted geese each winter (roughly one-third of the entire world's population), while in the summer Lady's Island Lake is an important breeding site for terns, especially the roseate tern. Three-quarters of the world population of pale bellied brent geese winter in Strangford Lough in County Down.

In 2001, the golden eagle was reintroduced into Glenveagh National Park after a 90-year absence from Ireland. A total of 46 golden eagles have been released in Ireland since 2001. In 2007, the first golden eagle chick hatched in Ireland since re-introduction. In 2006, 30 red kite birds originally from Wales were released in the Wicklow Mountains. Six weeks later one was shot dead, it was found to have 8 shotgun pellets in it. The first red kite chick hatched in 2010. In 2007, the white-tailed eagle returned to Ireland with six young birds being released in Killarney National Park after an absence of over 200 years from Ireland. Fifteen of these birds have been released in total. There are plans for the common crane to also return to Ireland in the future. While the osprey and marsh harrier have slowly returned to Ireland naturally.

In July 2019, Birdwatch Ireland reported that the Irish bird population was in "dramatic" decline, with 40 percent of the country's waterbirds, or half a million, lost in the prior 20 years. Loss of habitat was cited as the reason for the decline. Other reasons were climate changes, agriculture, hedge cutting, pollution, and the burning of scrub. Birdwatch Ireland called for the Citizens' Assembly to examine the biodiversity loss. One of every five Irish bird species assessed in the survey was threatened with extinction. Lapwing numbers, according to Birdwatch Ireland, were down 67% in twenty years. It also said there had been an "almost complete extermination" of farmland birds, for example the corncrake. The curlew was reported on the verge of extinction in Ireland, with only 150 pairs remaining. In the 1960s, 5,000 pairs had been reported.

=== Fish ===
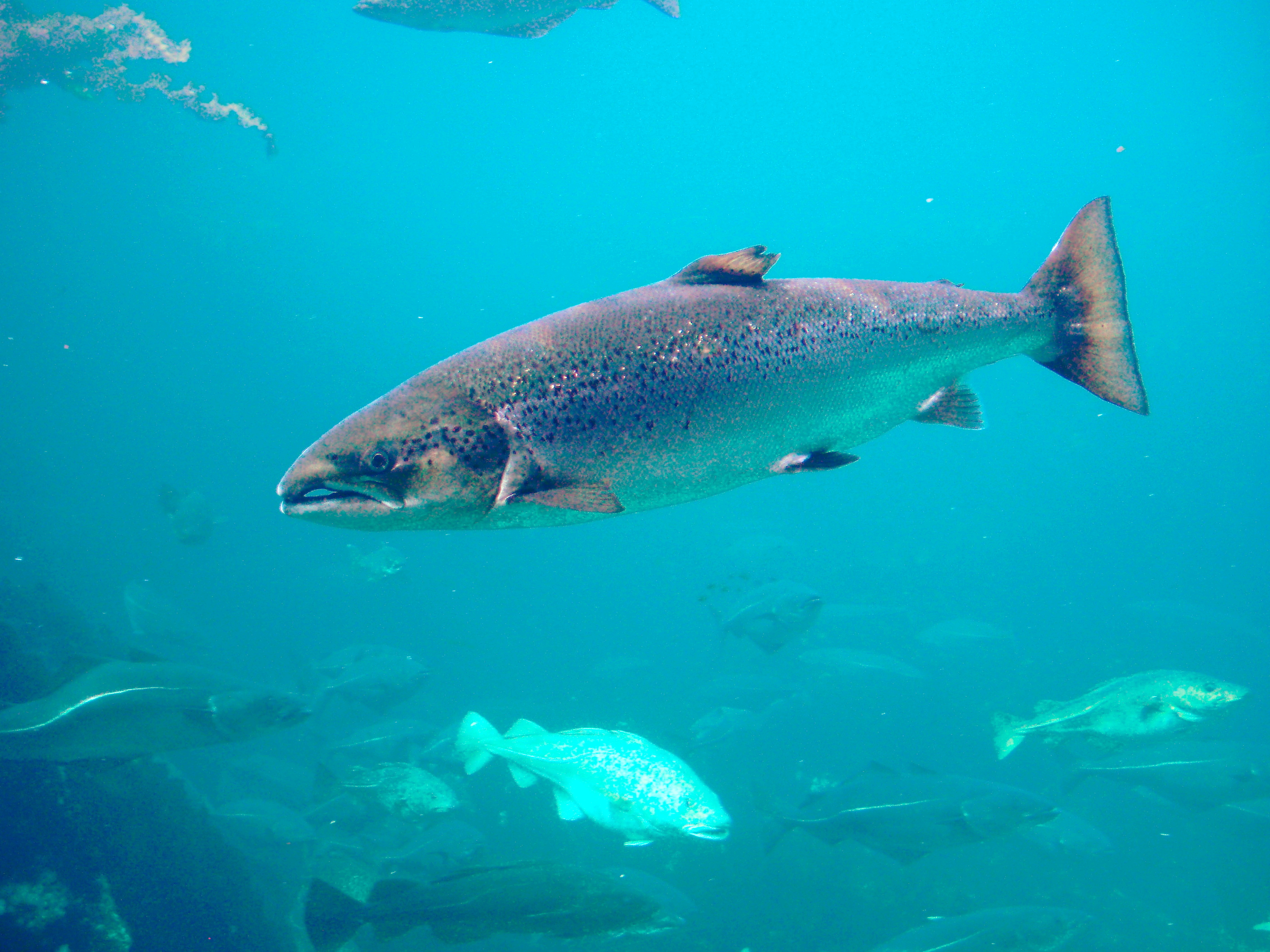
Atlantic salmon

Ireland has 375 fish species in its coastal waters and 40 freshwater species in its rivers and lakes. Most of these are pelagic. There are many aquatic mammals too, such as bottlenose dolphins, orca whales, and harbour porpoises. Sea turtles are also common off the western seaboard, and the walrus has also been found around the Irish coasts, but is very rare with only a handful of sightings. The cool, temperate waters around Ireland contain a huge variety of marine invertebrates Some of this diversity can be observed in tide pools.

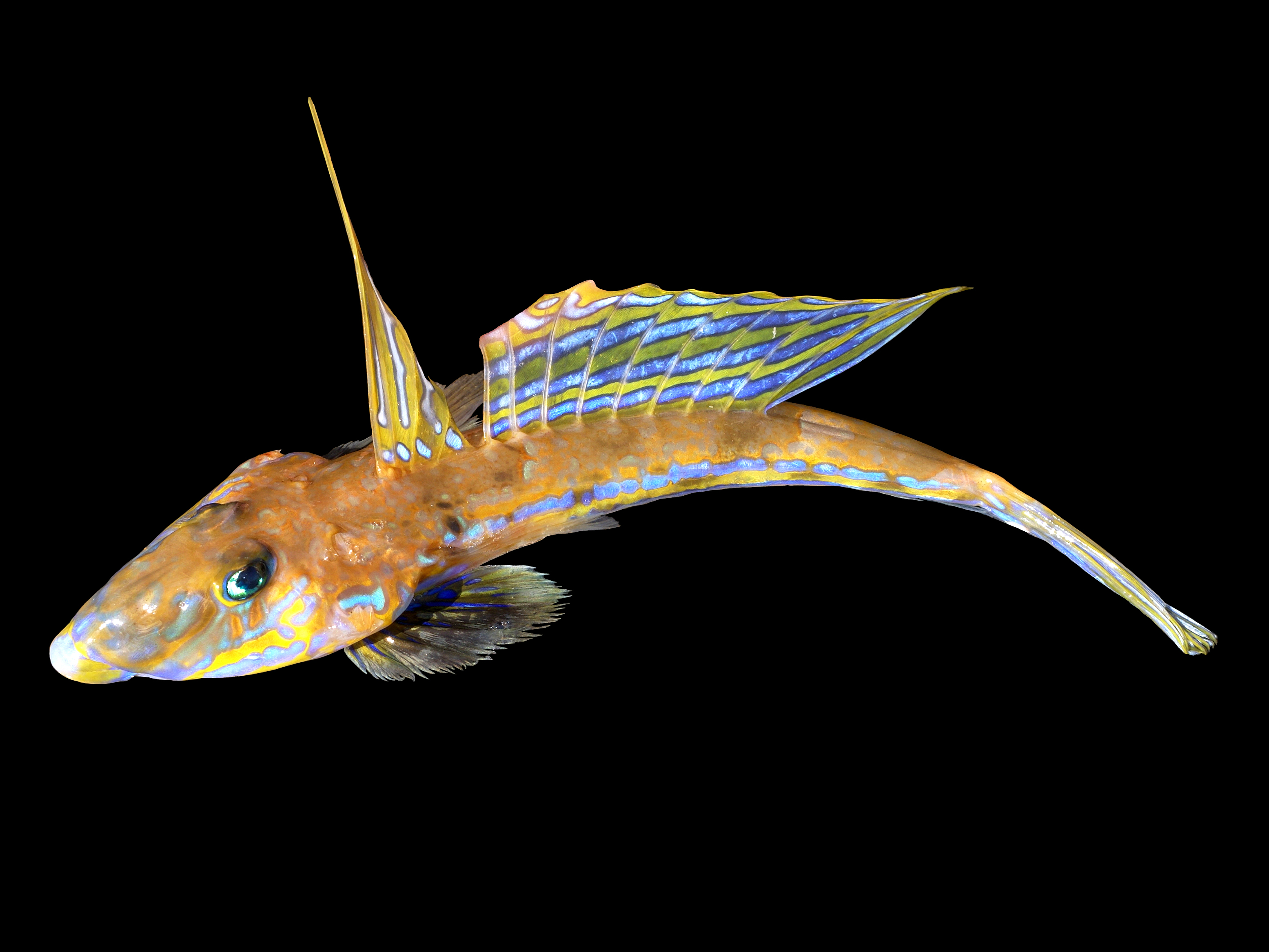
Common dragonet

There are 24 species of cetaceans and five species of sea turtles that have been recorded in Irish waters. The giant squid has been recorded on five occasions.

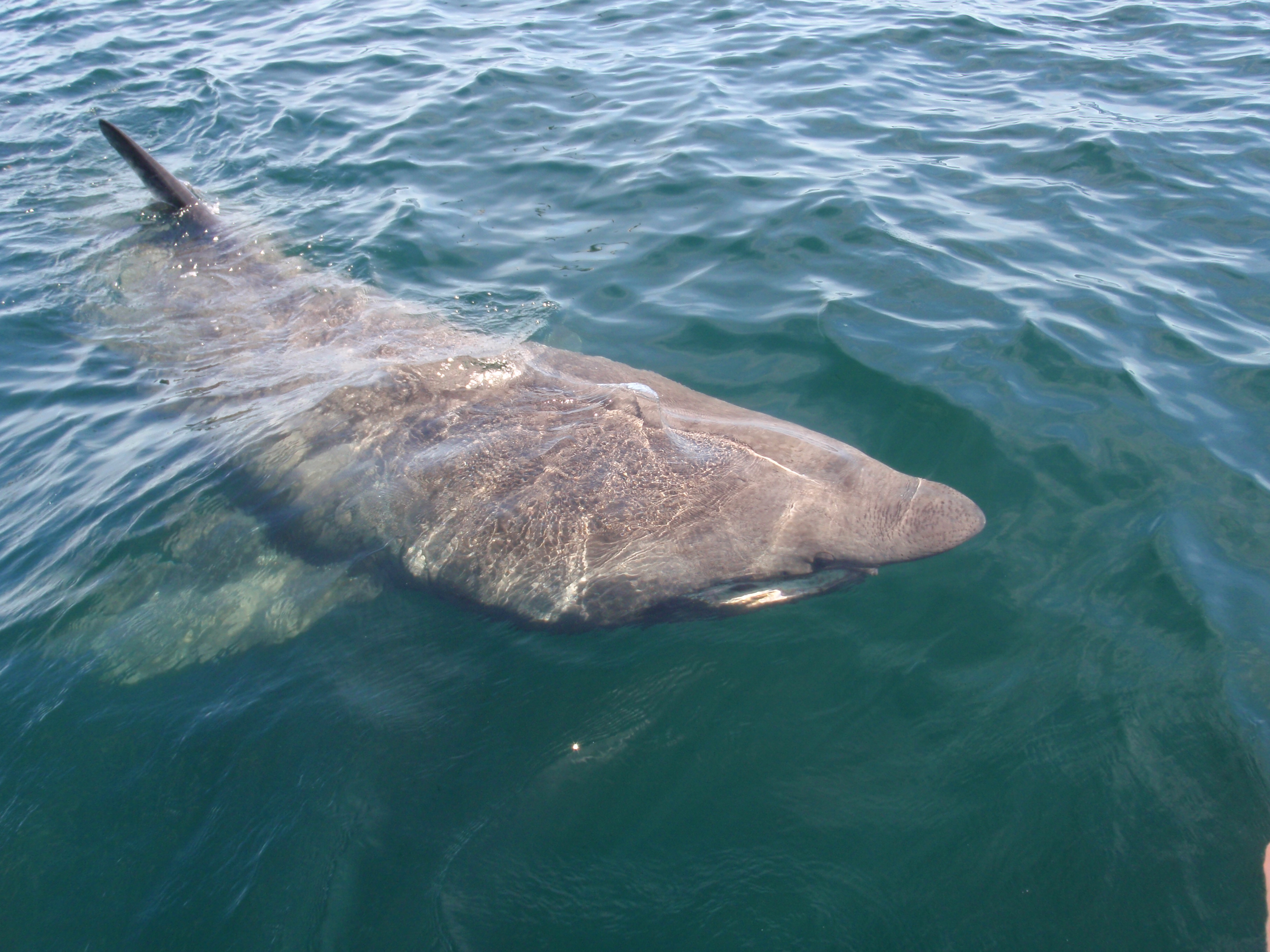
The basking shark is often seen off the west coast of Ireland

The Porcupine Abyssal Plain which has an average depth of 4,774 m is on the continental margin southwest of Ireland. It is the habitat for many deep sea fish and was first investigated in the summers of 1868 and 1869 by Charles Wyville Thomsons H.M.S. Porcupine expedition. Other notable fish include the basking shark, ocean sunfish, conger eel, hagfish, boarfish (Capros aper), large-eyed rabbitfish, lumpsucker, cuckoo wrasse, and the thresher shark.

In a study of the marine fauna of the Celtic Sea based on 61 beam trawl catches, the common dragonet and the hermit crab Pagurus prideaux were the most ubiquitous species.

== Invertebrates ==
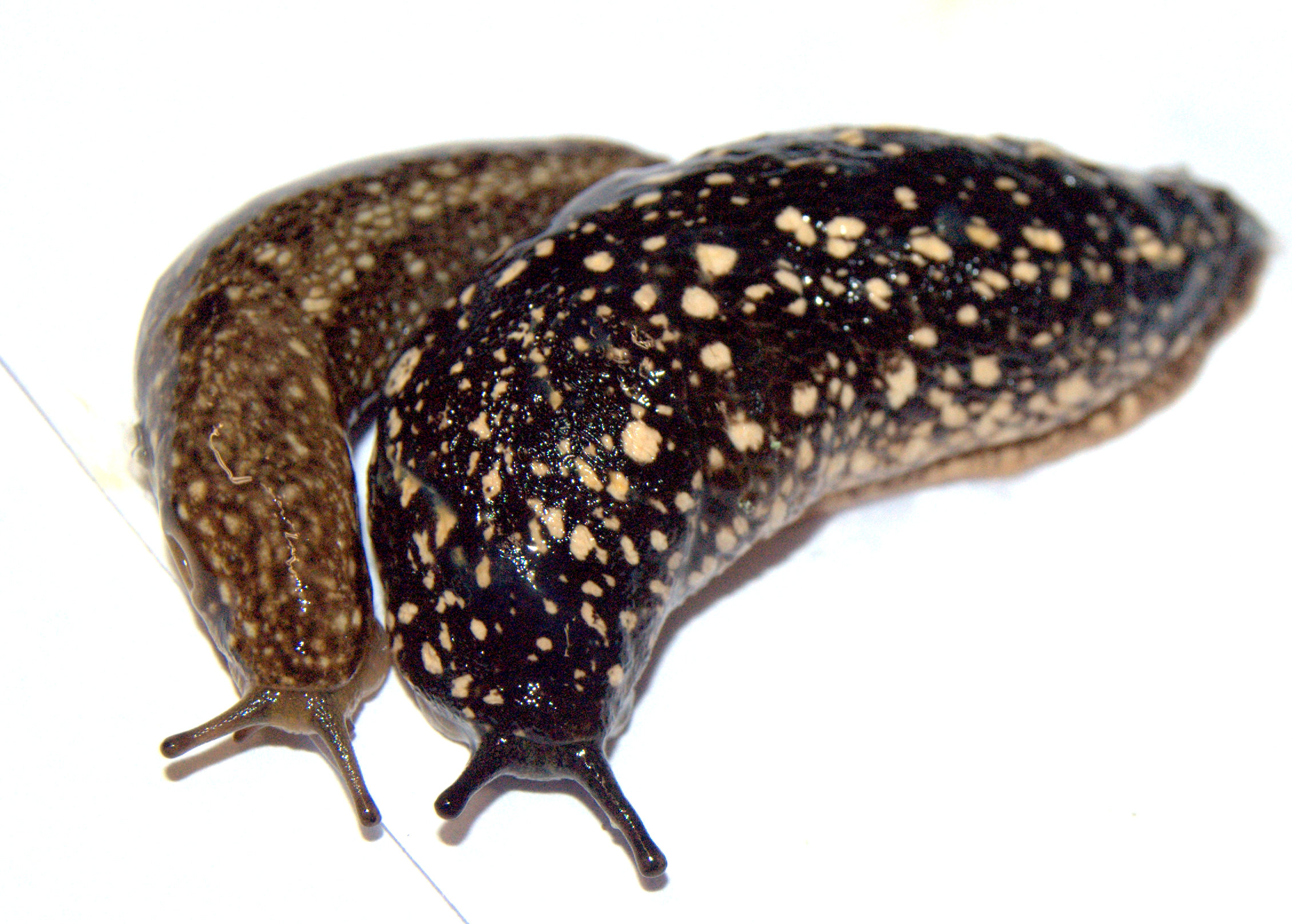
The Kerry slug is found only in Iberia and the west of Ireland, specifically County Kerry and County Galway

Notable Irish species of invertebrate include the freshwater pearl mussel, diving bell spider, marsh fritillary butterfly, Kerry slug, Semilimax pyrenaicus, freshwater crayfish, the white prominent moth, and Roesel's bush-cricket.

The aquatic insect fauna is listed by Ashe et al.

=== Insects and other arthropods ===
In 2010, Regan et al. confirmed there to be at least 11,422 species of insect in Ireland. O’Connor (1997) estimated up to 16,000 insects may be present. Six checklists of the Irish insect fauna have been published to date-Coleoptera, Lepidoptera, Diptera, Hymenoptera, and Hemiptera and small orders. The history and rationale of the lists is detailed by O'Connor. Spiders are represented by 378 species.

== Extinctions ==
Species that have become extinct in Ireland in historic times include the great auk, Irish elk, brown bear, Eurasian lynx, grey whale, and the wildcat. The last grey wolf in Ireland was killed by John Watson of Ballydarton on the slopes of Mount Leinster, County Carlow in 1786. Many bird of prey species including the golden eagle, white-tailed eagle, and red kite have been re-introduced to national parks after absences between 90 and 200 years.

== Zoology museums ==
These are the Natural History Museum Dublin which opened in 1856 and the Ulster Museum in Belfast which opened in 1929. Ireland's universities hold smaller collections. Trinity College Dublin also has a Zoological museum that is open during the summer months.

== Research ==
Irelands position on the continental shelf favours marine both marine life and faunal studies. There are two research stations Queen’s Marine Laboratory located on Strangford Lough and the Ryan Marine Science Institute in Galway.

In 2000, scientists in Ireland commenced a research programme called "Ag-Biota", concerning the impact of modern agriculture on biodiversity.

There is also continuous monitoring and research on Irish biodiversity carried out by the National Biodiversity Data Centre based in Waterford.

== History ==
An early (1180) account of the fauna is given by Gerald of Wales in Topographia Hibernica and in 1652 Gerard Boate's Natural History of Ireland was published. Also in the 17th century Thomas Molyneux made observations. The Clare Island Survey (1909–11) organised by Robert Lloyd Praeger was the first comprehensive biological survey carried out in the world. It became a model for studies elsewhere.

== See also ==
- Flora of Ireland
- Fauna of Europe
- Deer of Ireland
- Wolves in Ireland
- Bears in Ireland
- National Parks in the Republic of Ireland
- Belfast Natural History Society
- Dublin University Zoological Association
- Lusitanian distribution
- Category:Irish zoologists

=== Lists ===
- List of mammals of Ireland
- List of birds of Ireland
- List of amphibians of Ireland
- List of reptiles of Ireland
- List of butterflies in Ireland
- List of moths of Ireland
- List of fish of Ireland
- List of Diptera of Ireland
- List of Odonata species of Ireland
- List of non-marine molluscs of Ireland
- List of marine molluscs of Ireland
- List of Nemertea of Ireland
- List of seaslugs (Nudibranchia) of Ireland
- List of British Isles rockpool life
- List of endemic species of the British Isles
