= List of Orthoptera species of Ireland =

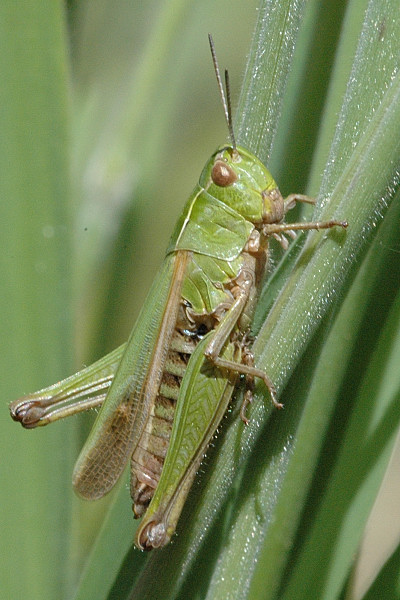
Common Green Grasshopper (Omocestus viridulus)

There are ten species of Orthoptera native to Ireland, seven grasshoppers and three bush-crickets . A further species, the mole cricket, is thought to be possibly extirpated, given only one record from 1920.

== Family: Acrididae ==
=== Subfamily: Gomphocerinae (slant-faced grasshoppers) ===
- Genus: Chorthippus
  - Lesser marsh grasshopper Chorthippus albomarginatus
  - Common field grasshopper Chorthippus brunneus
- Genus: Myrmeleotettix
  - Mottled Grasshopper Myrmeleotettix maculatus
- Genus: Omocestus
  - Common Green Grasshopper Omocestus viridulus

=== Subfamily: Oedipodinae (bandwings) ===
- Genus: Stethophyma
  - Large Marsh Grasshopper Stethophyma grossum

== Family: Phaneropteridae ==
=== Tribe: Barbitistini ===
- Genus: Leptophyes
  - Speckled bush-cricket Leptophyes punctatissima

== Family: Tettigoniidae ==
=== Subfamily: Meconematinae ===
- Genus: Meconema
  - Southern oak bush cricket. Meconema meridionale

=== Subfamily: Tettigoniinae ===
- Genus: Metrioptera
  - Roesel's bush-cricket Metrioptera roeselii

== Family: Tetrigidae (pygmy grasshoppers) ==
=== Subfamily: Tetriginae ===
- Genus: Tetrix
  - Slender Ground-hopper Tetrix subulata
  - Common Ground-hopper Tetrix undulata

== Family: Gryllotalpidae (mole crickets) ==
- Genus: Gryllotalpa
  - European mole cricket Gryllotalpa gryllotalpa possibly extirpated
