= List of amphibians of Ireland =

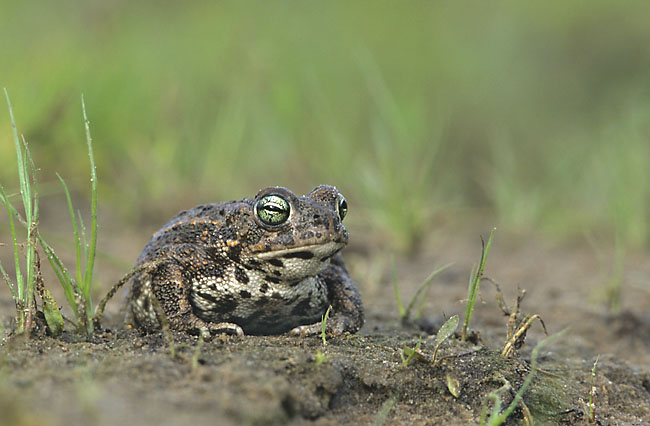
Natterjack toad

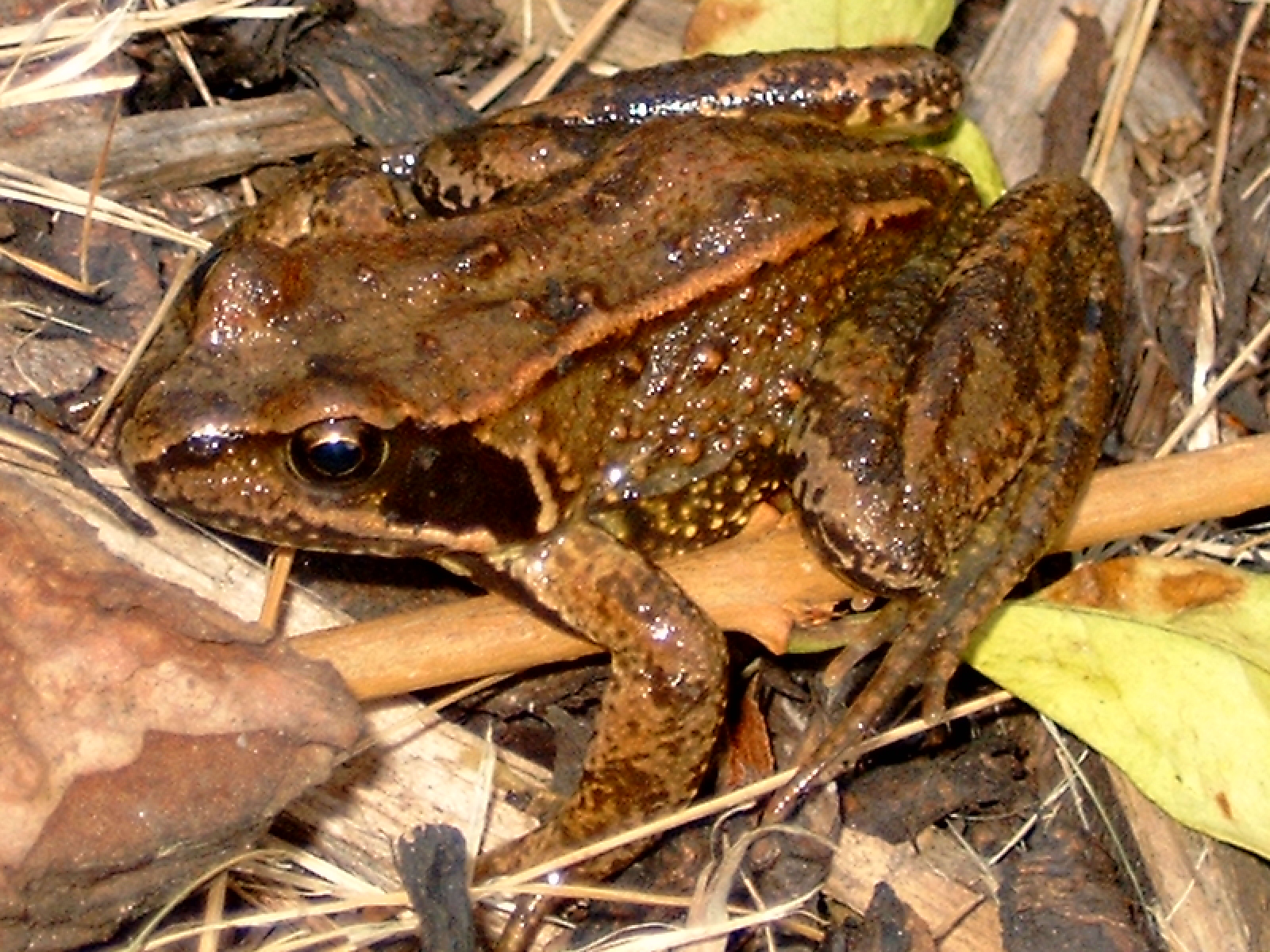
Common frog

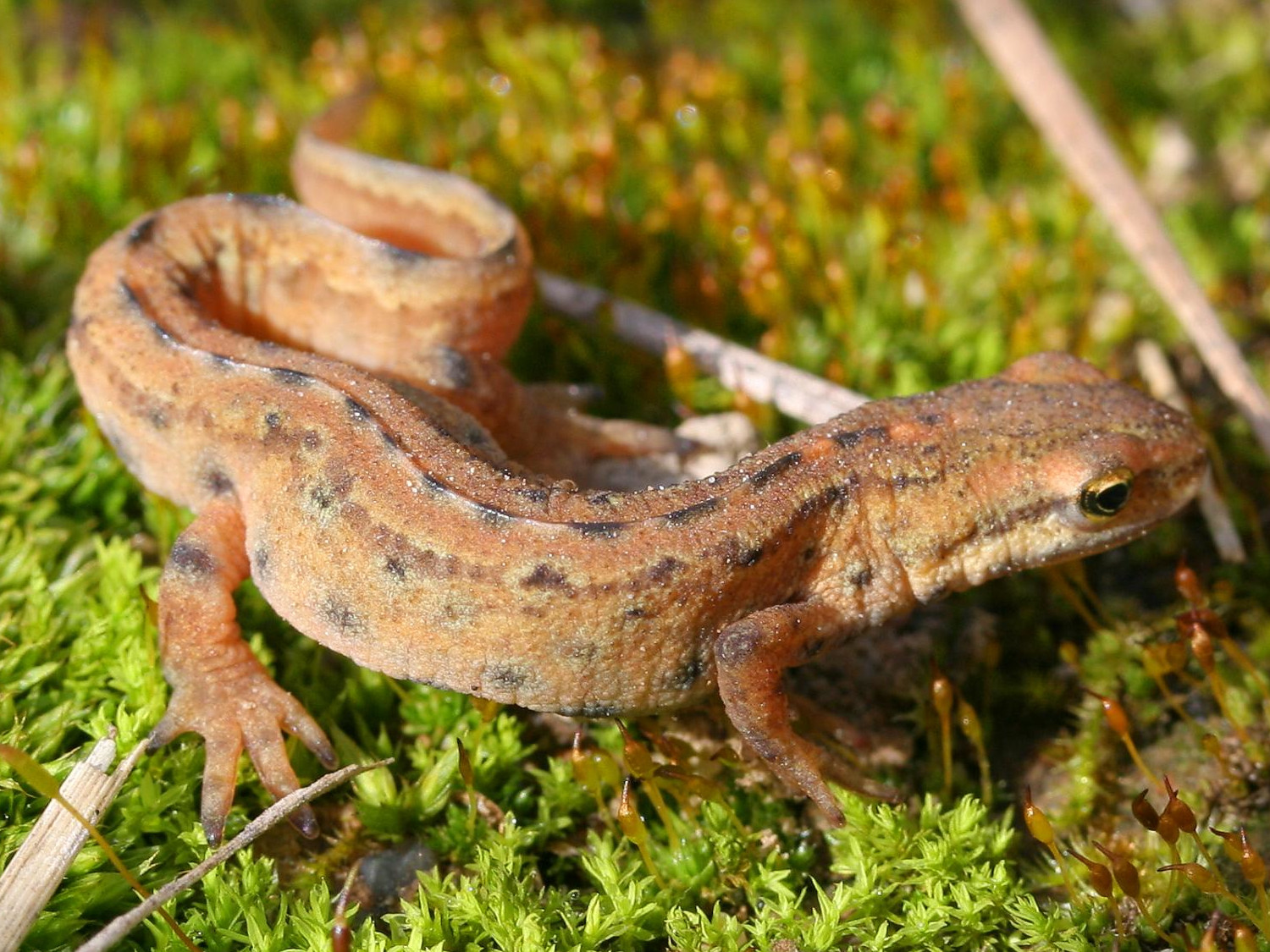
Smooth newt

There are 3 species of amphibian in Ireland; all are native. Globally, they are all rated as least concern on the IUCN Red List. However, in the regional Ireland Red List, the natterjack toad is listed as vulnerable.

== Subclass: Lissamphibia ==
=== Superorder: Salientia ===
==== Order: Anura ====
- Suborder: Neobatrachia
  - Family: Ranidae
    - Genus: Rana
      - European common brown frog (Rana temporaria)
  - Family: Bufonidae
    - Genus: Epidalea
      - Natterjack toad (Epidalea calamita)

==== Order: Caudata ====
- Suborder: Salamandroidea
  - Family: Salamandridae
    - Genus: Lissotriton
      - Smooth newt (Lissotriton vulgaris vulgaris)
