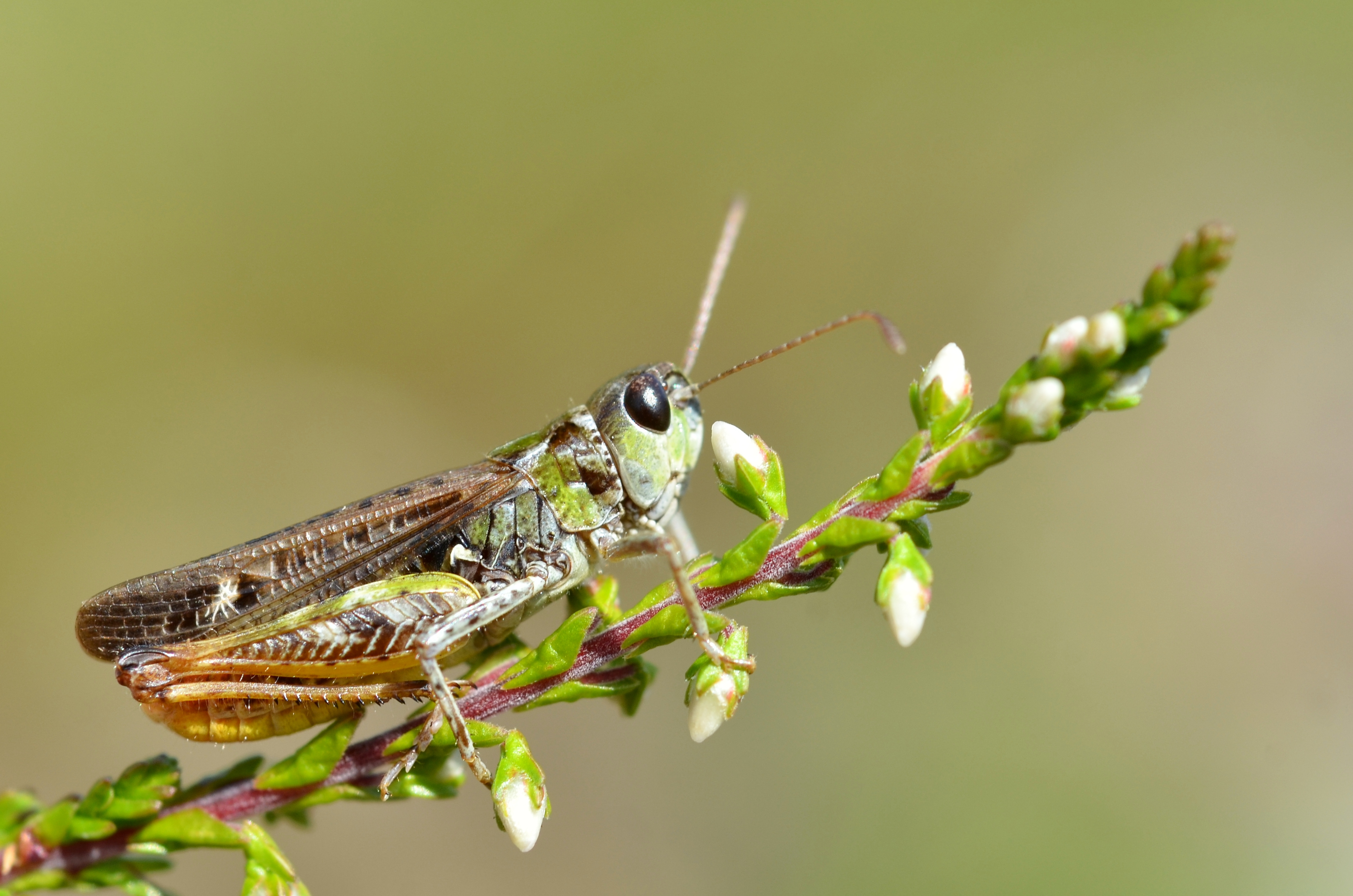
- M. maculatus.
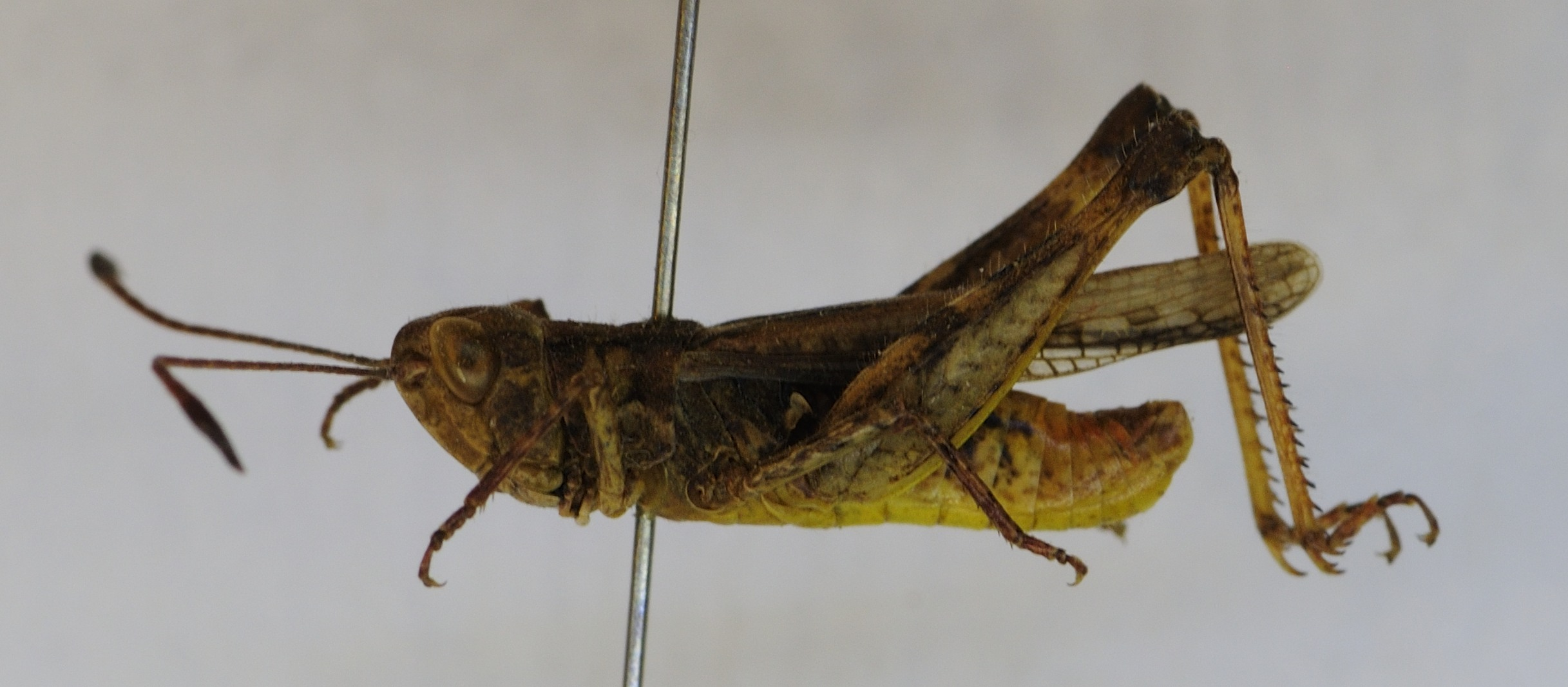
- M. antennatus.

Scientific classification
- Domain: Eukaryota
- Kingdom: Animalia
- Phylum: Arthropoda
- Class: Insecta
- Order: Orthoptera
- Suborder: Caelifera
- Family: Acrididae
- Tribe: Gomphocerini
- Genus: Myrmeleotettix; Bolívar, 1914

Type species
- Gomphocerus maculatus Thunberg, 1815

= Myrmeleotettix =

Genus of grasshoppers

Myrmeleotettix is a genus of grasshopper in the tribe Gomphocerini. Species are recorded from western Europe and throughout temperate Asia.

== Species ==
As of 2019, the genus consists of the following species:

- Myrmeleotettix angustiseptus Liu, 1982
- Myrmeleotettix antennatus (Fieber, 1853)
- Myrmeleotettix brachypterus Liu, 1982
- Myrmeleotettix ethicus Sirin & Ciplak, 2011
- Myrmeleotettix kunlunensis Huang, 1987
- Myrmeleotettix longipennis Zhang, 1984
- Myrmeleotettix maculatus (Thunberg, 1815)
- Myrmeleotettix pallidus (Brunner von Wattenwyl, 1882)
- Myrmeleotettix palpalis (Zubovski, 1900)
- Myrmeleotettix pluridentis Liang, 1987
- Myrmeleotettix zaitzevi Mistshenko, 1968
