= List of reptiles of Ireland =

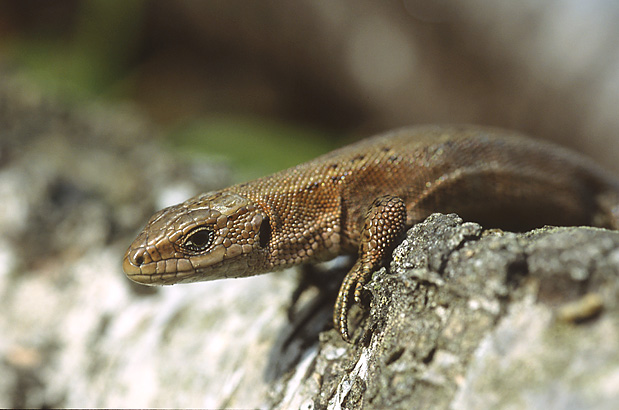
A male viviparous lizard

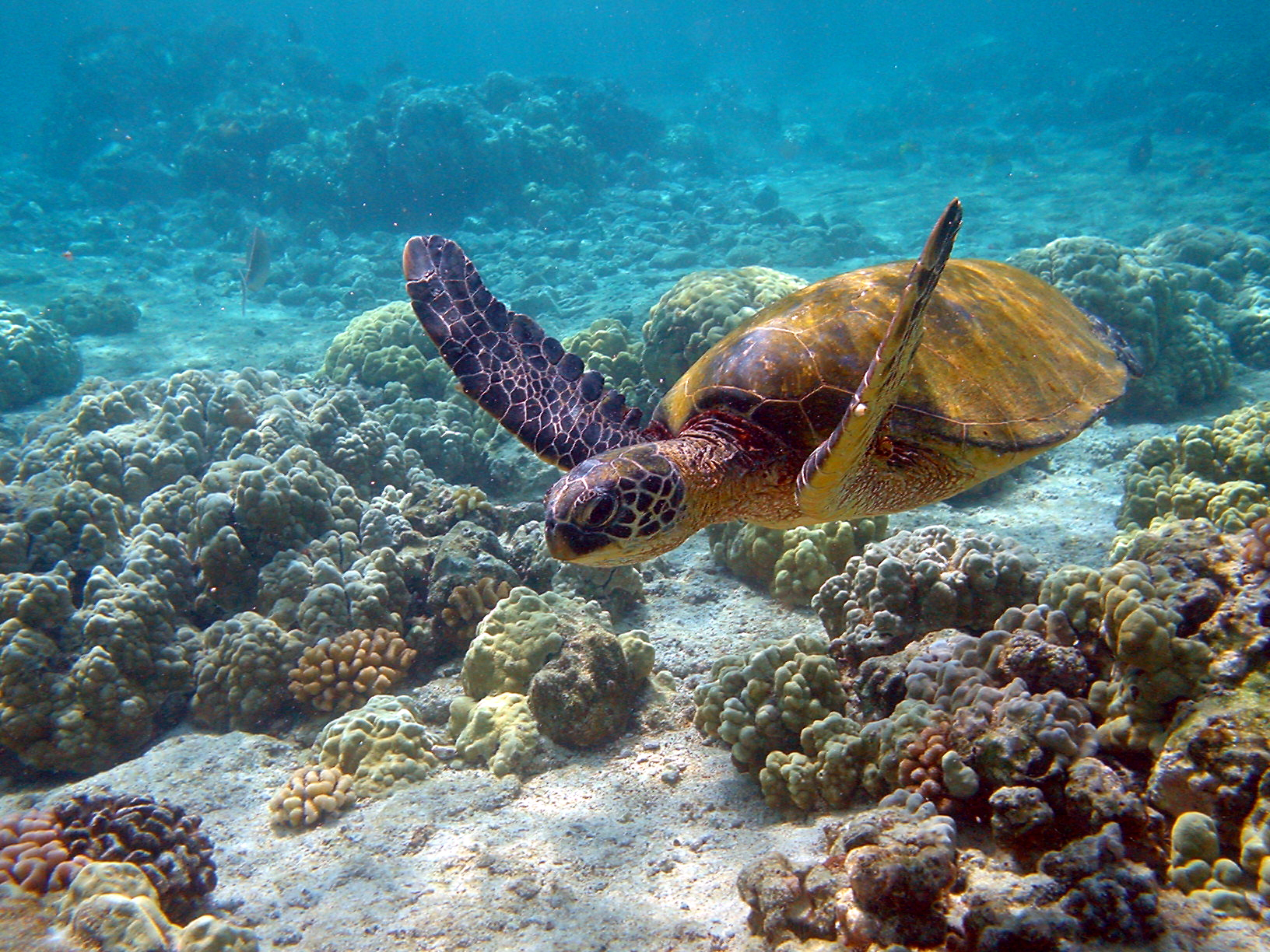
Green sea turtle

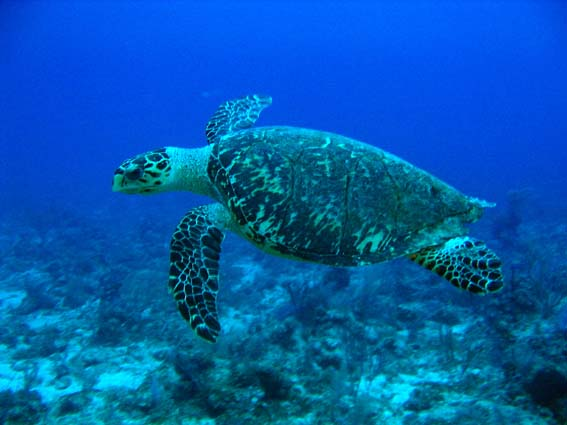
Hawksbill turtle

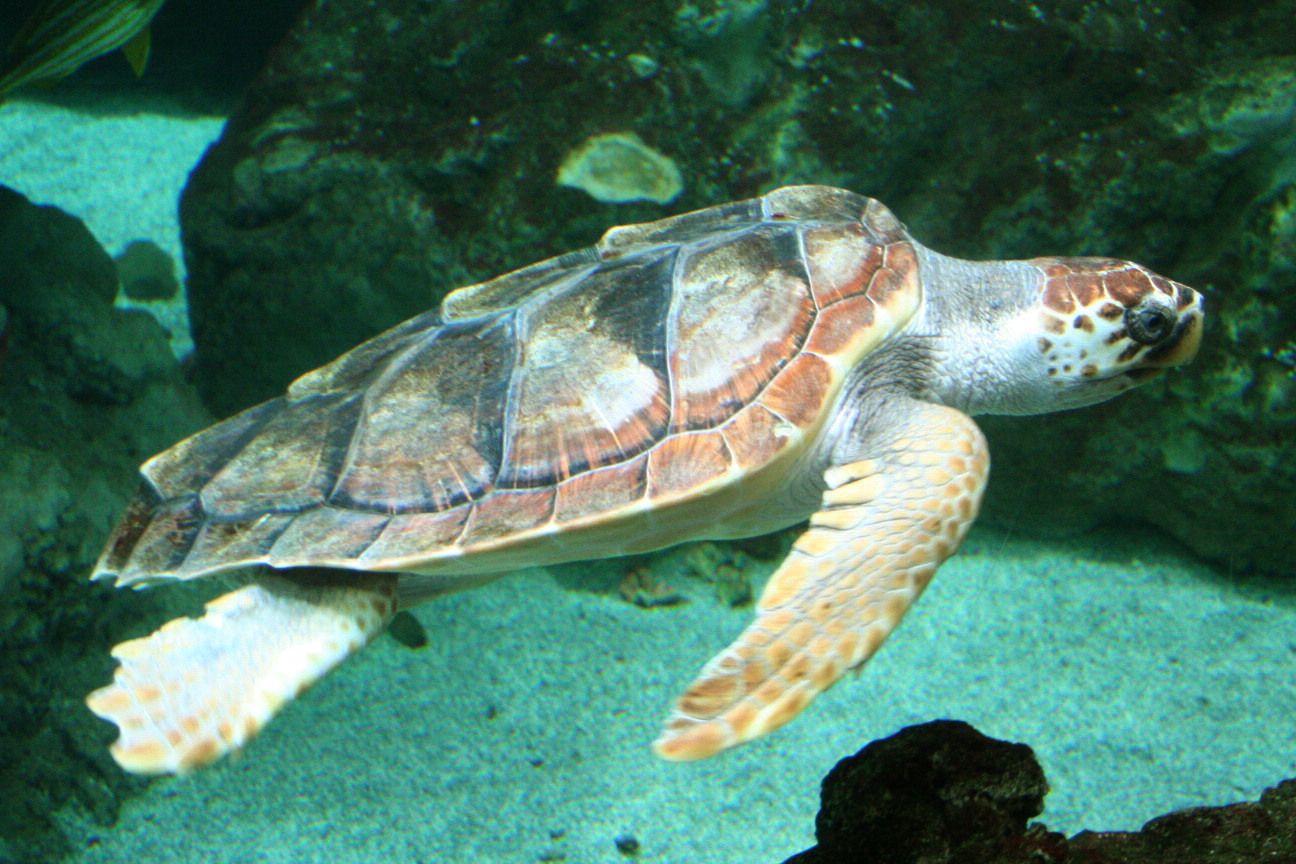
Loggerhead sea turtle

There is only one known land reptile species native to Ireland, the viviparous lizard. It appears to have a widespread distribution across the entire island with coastal, bogland and mountainous areas showing highest numbers of sightings.

Five marine turtle species appear regularly off the west coast but do not come ashore. All are endangered, some critically. The pond turtle is introduced.

Icons which state each species' global IUCN status:
CR	Critically Endangered	In imminent risk of extinction in the wild
VU	Vulnerable	Facing a high risk of extinction in the wild
LC	Least Concern	No current identifiable risks to this species

== Subclass: Diapsida ==
=== Infraclass: Lepidosauromorpha ===
==== Superorder: Lepidosauria ====
===== Order: Squamata (lizards, snakes) =====
- Suborder: Lacertilia (lizards)
  - Family: Lacertidae
    - Subfamily: Lacertinae
      - Genus: Zootoca
        - Viviparous lizard, Zootoca vivipara LC
  - Family: Anguidae
    - Subfamily: Anguinae
      - Genus: Anguis
        - Slowworm, Anguis fragilis LC (thought to be introduced from Britain in the 1970s, only found in the Burren)

=== Order: Testudines (turtles) ===
- Suborder: Cryptodira
  - Superfamily: Chelonioidea (sea turtles)
    - Family: Dermochelyidae
      - Genus: Dermochelys
        - Leatherback sea turtle, Dermochelys coriacea VU
    - Family: Cheloniidae
      - Genus: Chelonia
        - Green sea turtle, Chelonia mydas LC
      - Genus: Eretmochelys
        - Hawksbill sea turtle, Eretmochelys imbricata CR
      - Genus: Lepidochelys
        - Kemp's ridley sea turtle, Lepidochelys kempii CR Vagrant
      - Genus: Caretta
        - Loggerhead sea turtle, Caretta caretta VU
  - Superfamily: Testudinoidea (pond turtles)
    - Family: Emydidae
      - Genus: Trachemys
        - Pond slider, Trachemys scripta LC Introduced
