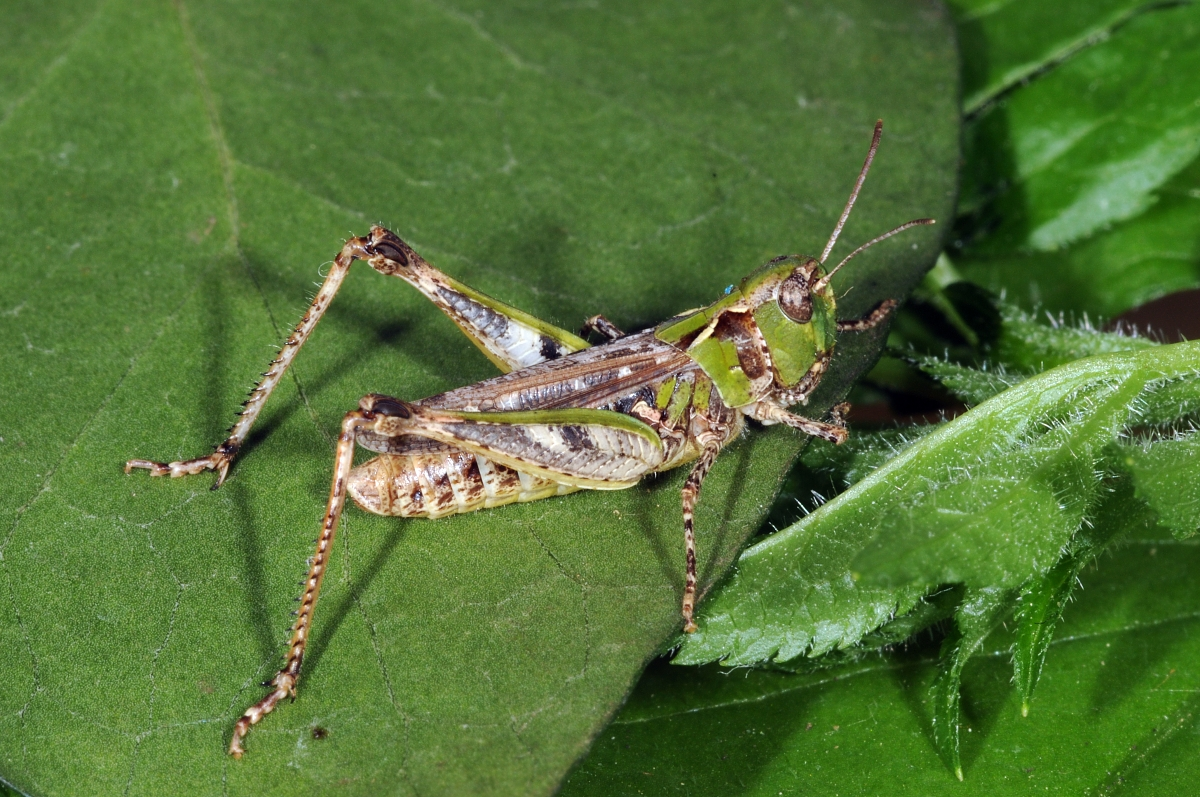
- Myrmeleotettix maculatus Germany

Scientific classification
- Domain: Eukaryota
- Kingdom: Animalia
- Phylum: Arthropoda
- Class: Insecta
- Order: Orthoptera
- Suborder: Caelifera
- Family: Acrididae
- Subfamily: Gomphocerinae
- Tribe: Gomphocerini
- Genus: Myrmeleotettix
- Species: M. maculatus

Binomial name
- Myrmeleotettix maculatus (Thunberg, 1815)

= Myrmeleotettix maculatus =

Species of grasshopper

Myrmeleotettix maculatus is a species belonging to the subfamily Gomphocerinae and may be called the mottled grasshopper. It is found across the Palearctic east to Siberia. In the north, it is spread from the British Isles to Scandinavia and Russia, north to about the Arctic Circle, in the south to Morocco, over the south of Spain, Calabria and Greece to Turkey . They are found from sea level to about 2,500 meters above sea level, for example in the French Alps and the Balkans.

Close-Up of a Myrmeleotettix maculatus
