= List of butterflies of Ireland =

This is a list of Irish butterflies, past and present. Details on specific species are relevant to the Irish populations and some details may not be consistent with the species in other parts of its range.

EX	Extinct	No reasonable doubt that the last individual has died.
EW	Extinct in the wild	Known only to survive in captivity or as a naturalized populations well outside its previous range.
CR	Critically endangered	The species is in imminent risk of extinction in the wild.
EN	Endangered	The species is facing an extremely high risk of extinction in the wild.
VU	Vulnerable	The species is facing a high risk of extinction in the wild.
NT	Near threatened	The species does not meet any of the criteria that would categorise it as risking extinction but it is likely to do so in the future.
LC	Least concern	There are no current identifiable risks to the species.
DD	Data deficient	There is inadequate information to make an assessment of the risks to this species.

== Family Hesperiidae (skippers) ==
=== Subfamily Hesperiinae (grass skippers) ===
- Essex skipper - Thymelicus lineola NE County Wexford only. Origin uncertain.
- Small skipper - Thymelicus sylvestris NE Confirmed in County Kildare in 2011 and 2012.

=== Subfamily Pyrginae (spread-winged skippers) ===
- Dingy skipper – Erynnis tages NT Mainly Midlands and West. The subspecies baynesi Huggins, 1956 is recorded from the Burren region of Co. Clare and Galway. The populations elsewhere in Ireland are presumably the type subspecies.

== Family Pieridae (whites) ==
=== Subfamily Dismorphiinae ===
- Wood white – Leptidea sinapis NT Confined to the Burren area of Co. Clare and Co. Galway (here sympatric with Leptidea juvernica)
- Cryptic wood white - Leptidea juvernica NE stat. nov. All regions of Ireland. Not known in Britain.

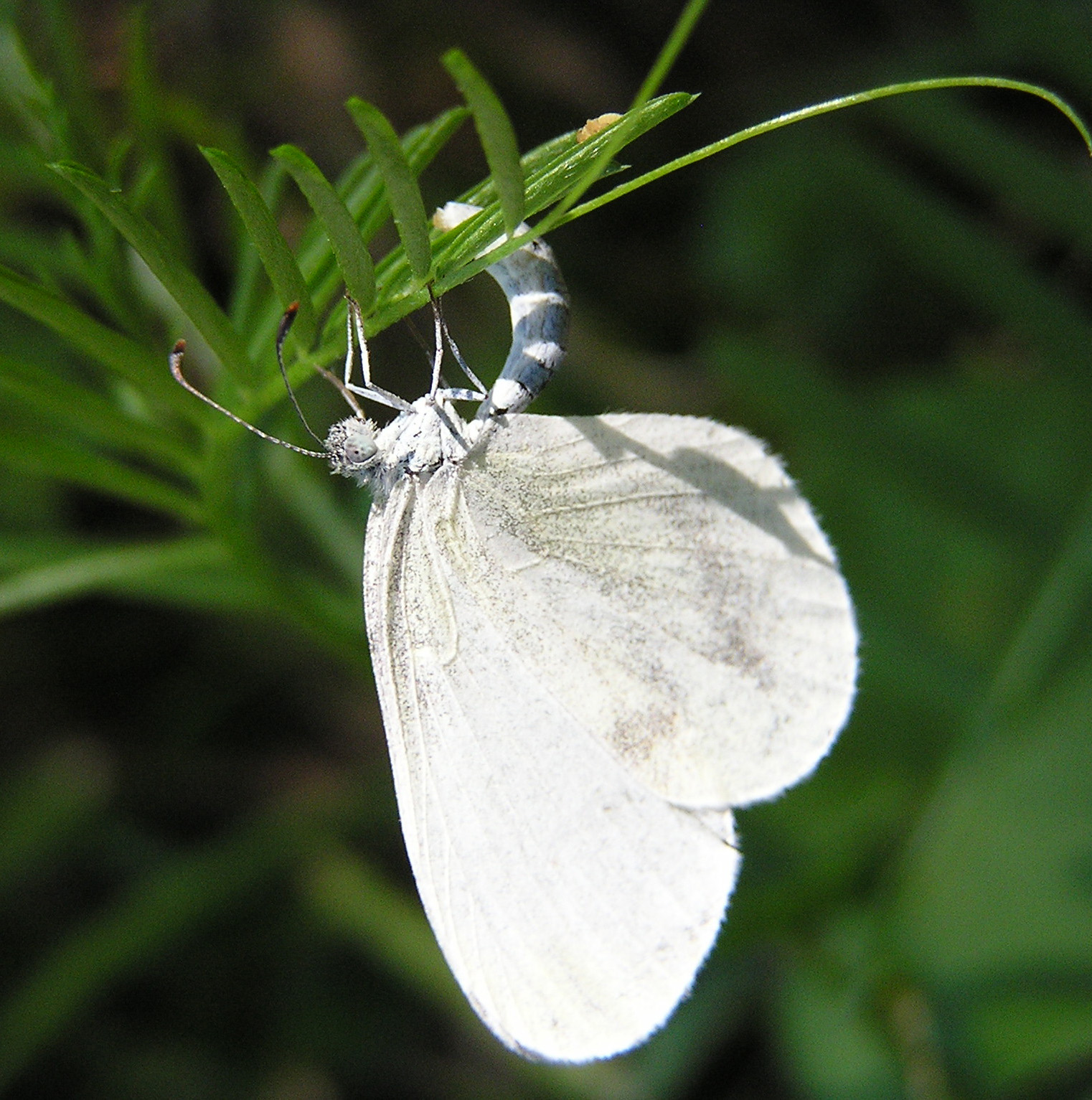
Wood white

=== Subfamily Coliadinae ===
- Clouded yellow – Colias croceus LC Migrant and breeding species
- Brimstone – Gonepteryx rhamni LC Burren and Midlands. The Irish subspecies is gravesi Huggins, 1956

=== Subfamily Pierinae ===
- Large white – Pieris brassicae LC
- Small white – Pieris rapae LC
- Green-veined white – Pieris napi LC The subspecies britannica (Muller & Kautz, 1939) is only found in Ireland. The British subspecies is sabellicae (Stephens, 1827)
- Orange tip – Anthocharis cardamines LC The Irish subspecies is hibernica (Williams, 1916)

== Family Lycaenidae (gossamer-winged butterflies) ==
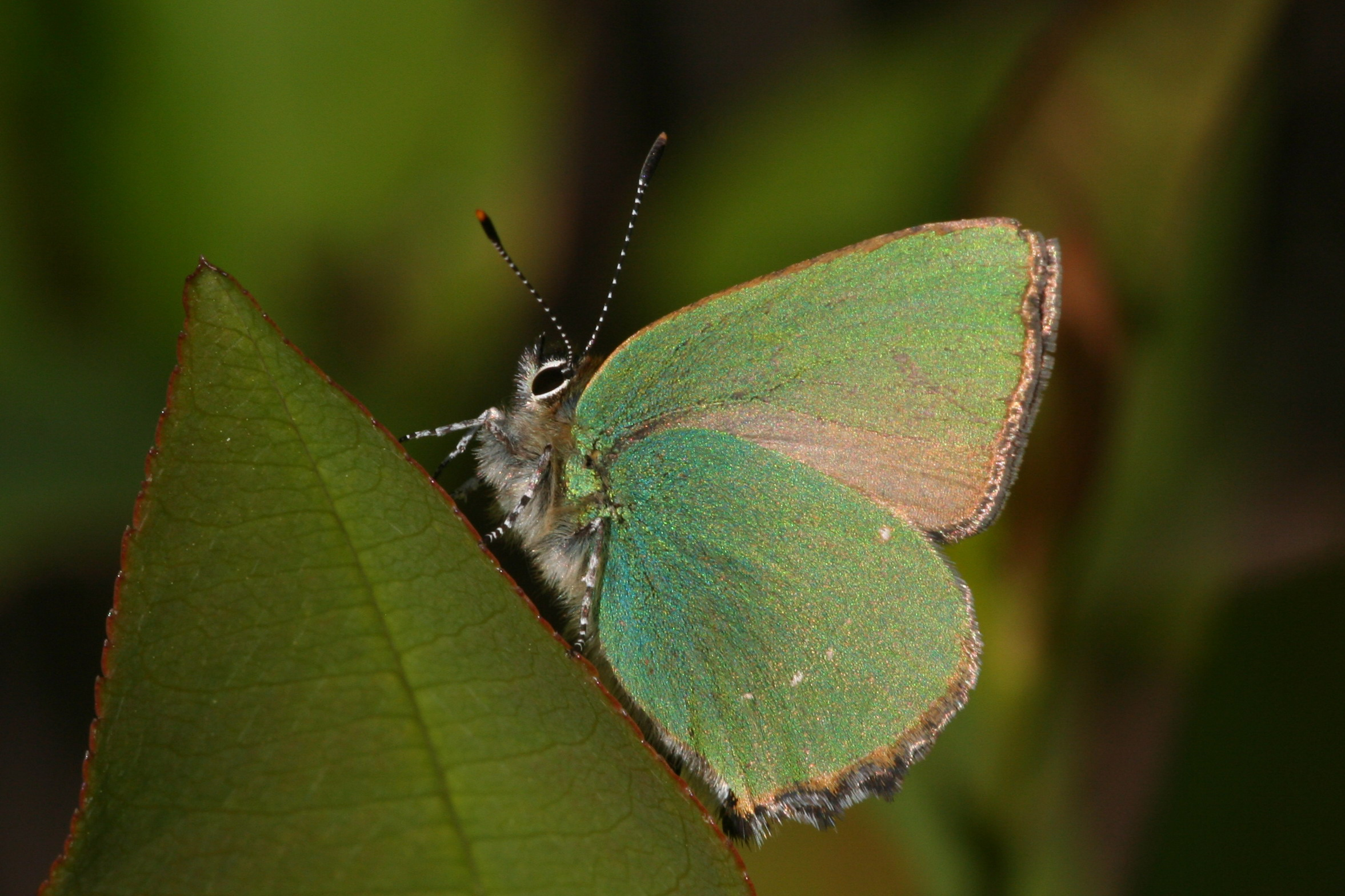
Green hairstreak

=== Subfamily Theclinae ===
- Green hairstreak – Callophrys rubi LC Scattered distribution.
- Brown hairstreak – Thecla betulae LC Restricted to Burren and regions north to Lough Mask, Co. Mayo where recent spread seems to be happening.
- Purple hairstreak – Neozephyrus quercus LC Restricted to a few woodland sites.

=== Subfamily Lycaeninae ===
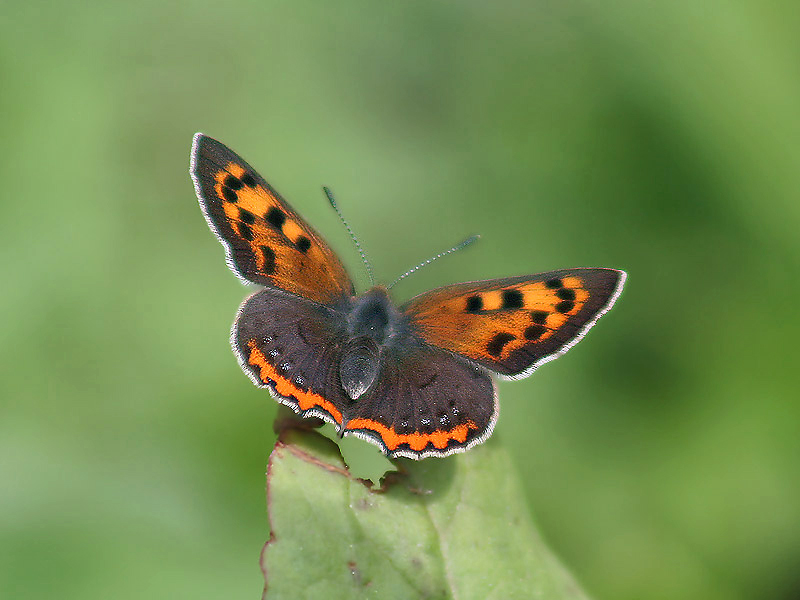
Small copper

- Small copper – Lycaena phlaeas LC The Irish subspecies is hibernica Goodson, 1948

=== Subfamily Polyommatinae ===
- Small blue – Cupido minimus EN Few regions. Restricted to coastal dunes, limestone grasslands and quarries.
- Common blue – Polyommatus icarus LC The Irish subspecies is mariscolore (Kane, 1893)
- Holly blue – Celastrina argiolus LC Found across most of Ireland having spread significantly north and west.

== Family Nymphalidae (brush-footed butterflies) ==
=== Subfamily Nymphalinae ===
- Red admiral – Vanessa atalanta LC resident reinforced by migrant populations.
- Painted lady – Vanessa cardui LC Migrant.
- Peacock – Aglais io LC
- Small tortoiseshell – Aglais urticae LC
- Comma – Polygonia c-album NE recent colonist and now found across most of island having spread from south-east.

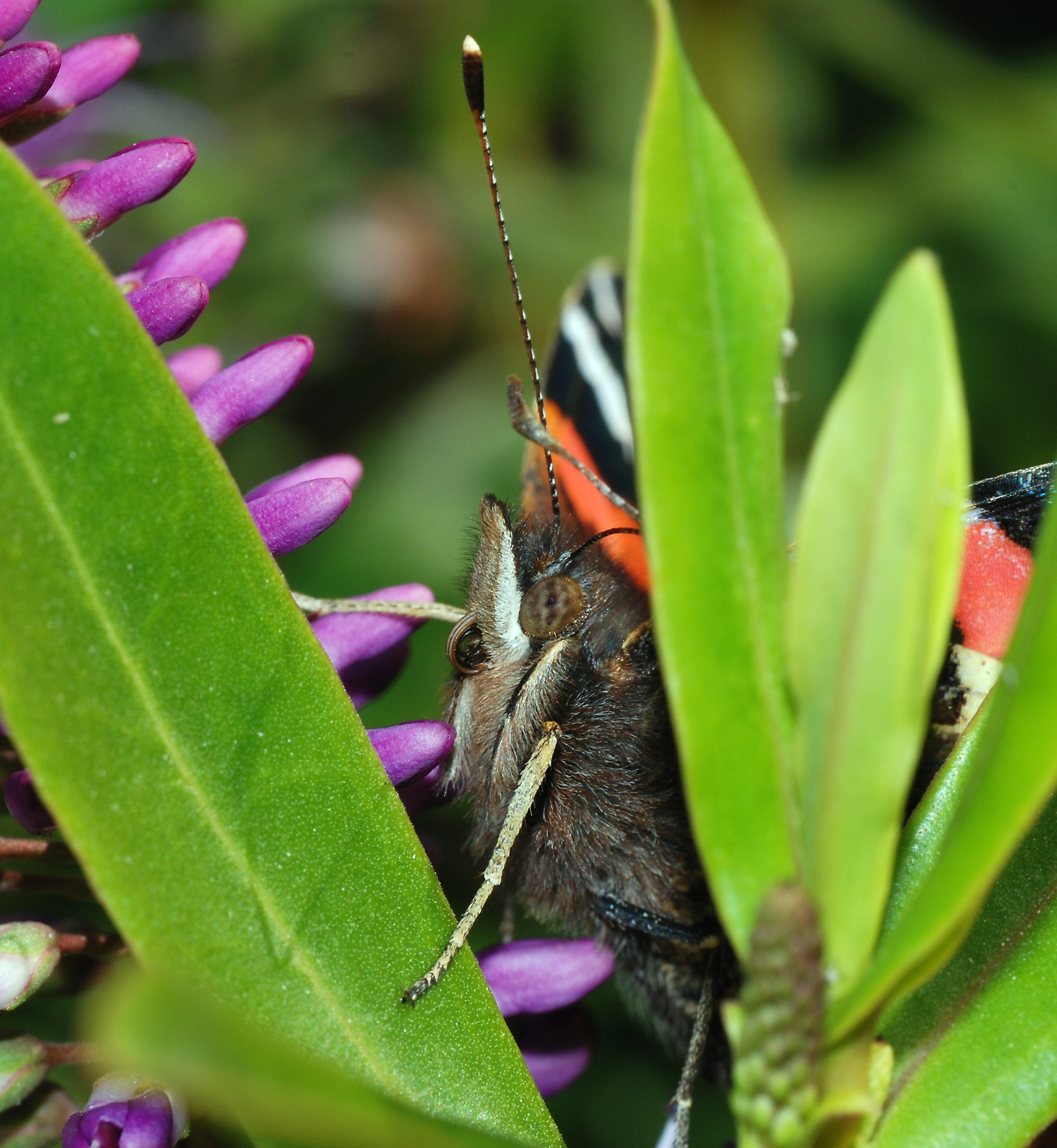
Red admiral peeping from behind a Hebe × franciscana

=== Subfamily Heliconiinae (longwings) ===
- Pearl-bordered fritillary – Boloria euphrosyne EN Only found in the Burren
- Dark green fritillary – Speyeria aglaja VU Coastal species also inland in the Burren and Wicklow
- Silver-washed fritillary – Argynnis paphia LC Scattered throughout Ireland, more common in southern regions.
- Marsh fritillary – Euphydryas aurinia VU infrasubspecies hibernica Birchall, 1873. Throughout Ireland but mainly Central and West Ireland.

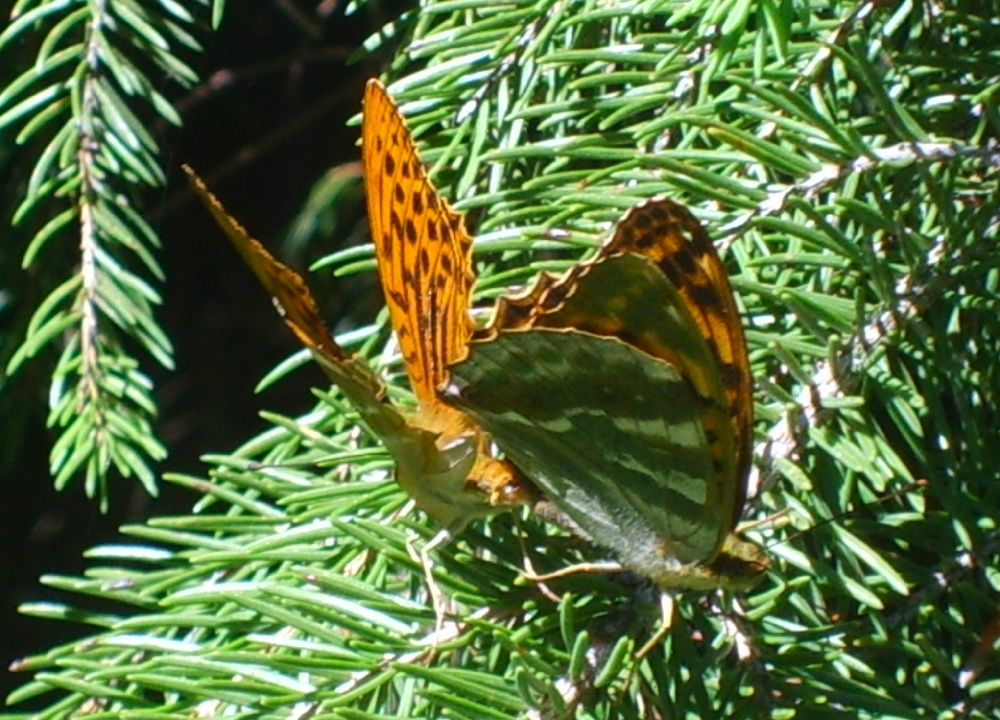
Argynnis paphia mating

=== Subfamily Satyrinae (browns) ===
- Speckled wood – Pararge aegeria LC
- Wall – Lasiommata megera EN
- Grayling – Hipparchia semele NT Coastal and limestone districts. The Irish subspecies are clarensis de Lattin, 1952 (County Clare) and hibernica Howarth, 1971
- Gatekeeper – Pyronia tithonus NT Restricted to South and South-East coasts.
- Meadow brown – Maniola jurtina LC The Irish subspecies is iernes Graves, 1930
- Ringlet – Aphantopus hyperantus LC
- Small heath – Coenonympha pamphilus NT Scattered throughout Ireland.Prefers drier grassland on well-drained soils.
- Large heath – Coenonympha tullia VU Restricted to bogs and absent from most of south and east where habitats largely non-existent.

== Vagrant, adventive, extinct and intercepts and exotic species ==
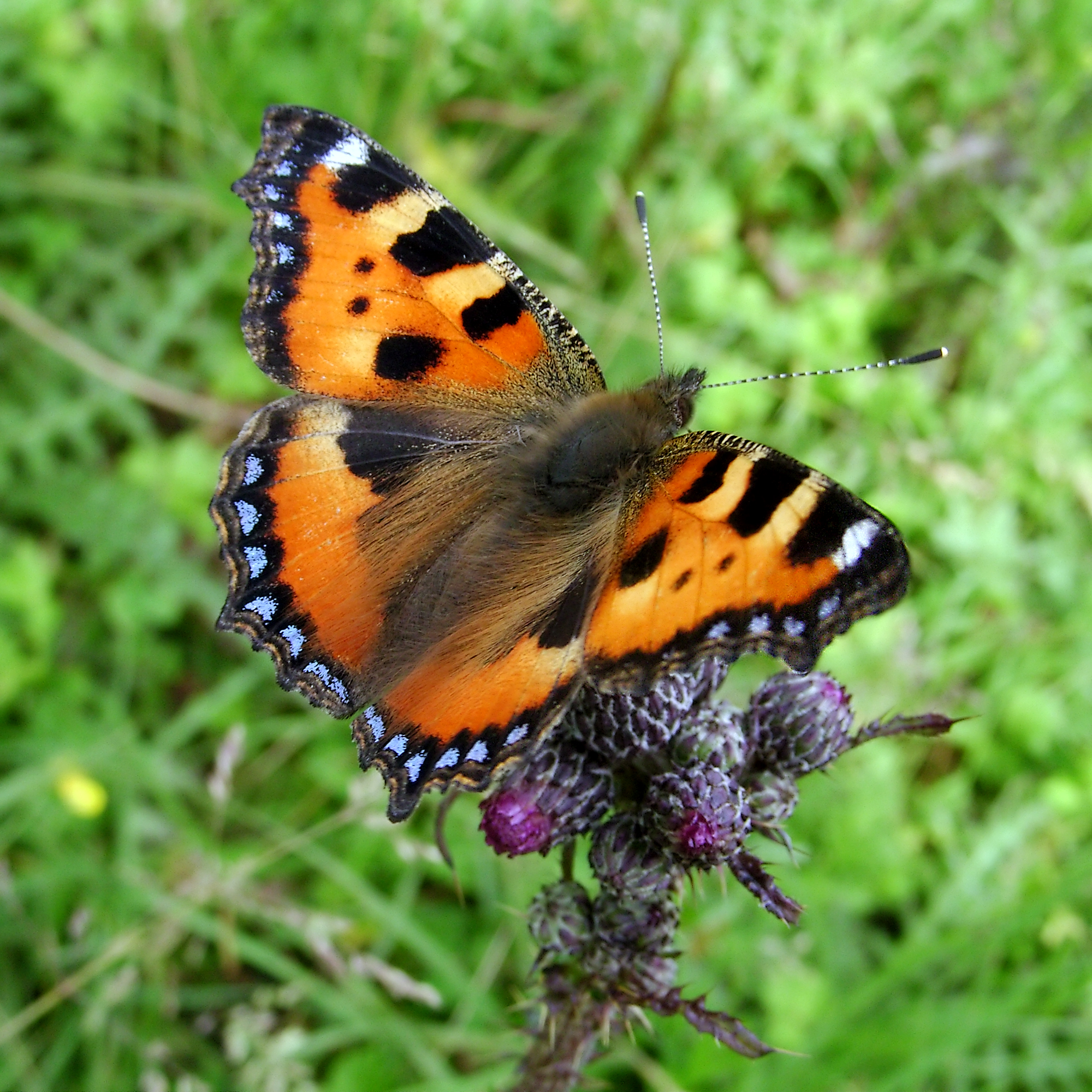
Aglais urticae – small tortoiseshell

Extinct

- Small mountain ringlet – Erebia epiphron EX
- Large copper - Lycaena dispar EX

Vagrants

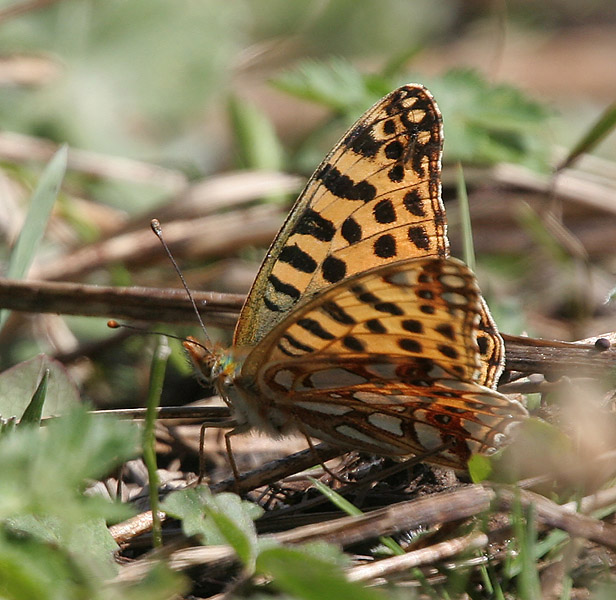
Queen of Spain fritillary

- Pale clouded yellow – Colias hyale
- Berger's clouded yellow – Colias alfacariensis
- Short-tailed blue – Cupido argiades NE (imported on fennel from Italy)
- Geranium bronze – Cacyreus marshalli NE (imported on geraniums)
- Camberwell beauty – Nymphalis antiopa NE
- Map – Araschnia levana NE (formerly introduced and bred)
- Queen of Spain fritillary – Issoria lathonia NE
- Monarch – Danaus plexippus NE
- American painted lady – Vanessa virginiensis NE
- Swallowtail – Papilio machaon NE

== See also ==
- List of moths of Ireland
