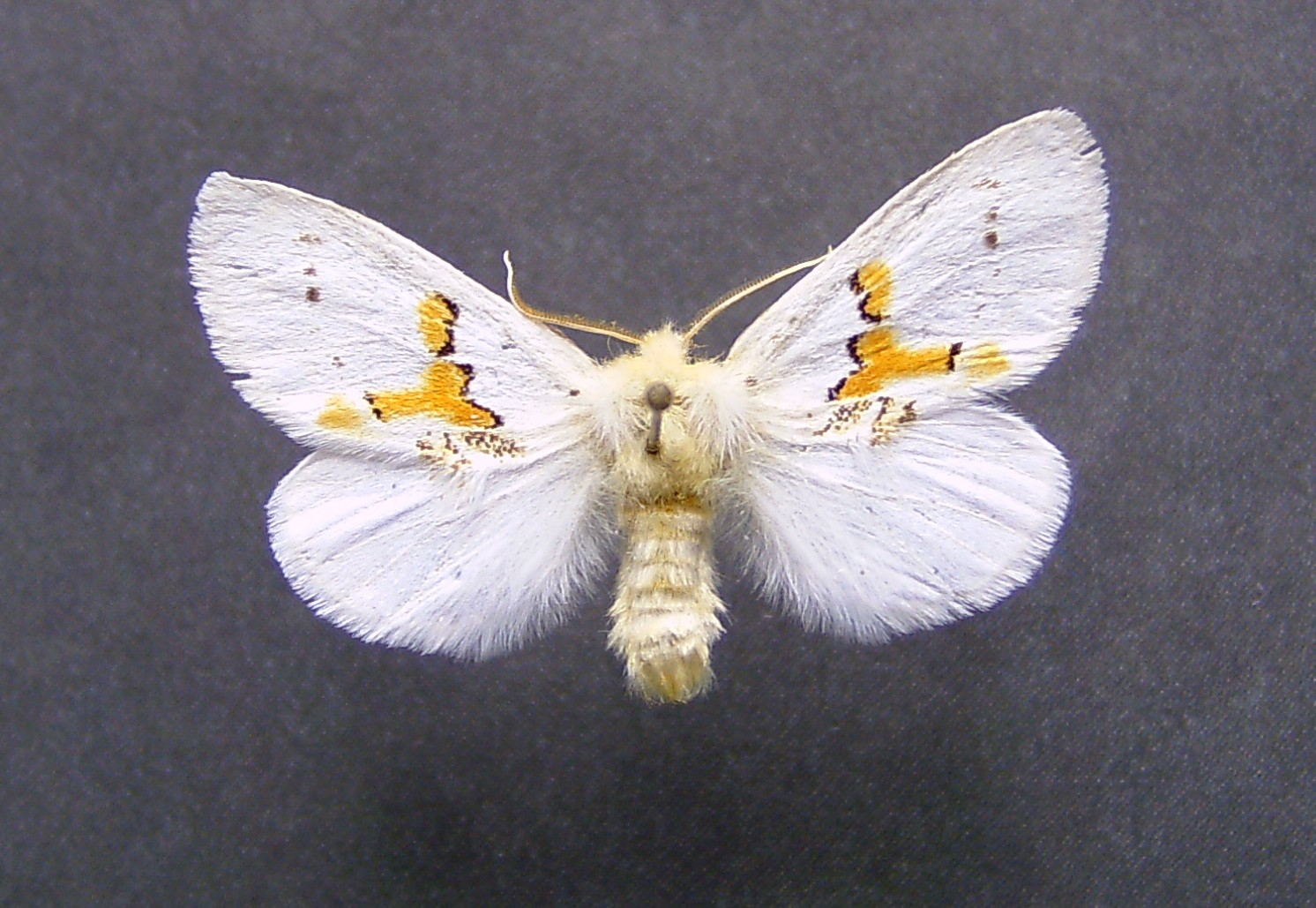
- Mounted specimen with wings spread

Scientific classification
- Kingdom: Animalia
- Phylum: Arthropoda
- Clade: Pancrustacea
- Class: Insecta
- Order: Lepidoptera
- Superfamily: Noctuoidea
- Family: Notodontidae
- Genus: Leucodonta
- Species: L. bicoloria

Binomial name
- Leucodonta bicoloria (Denis & Schiffermüller, 1775)

= Leucodonta bicoloria =

Species of moth

Leucodonta bicoloria, the white prominent, is a moth from the family Notodontidae. It ranges from Western Europe (Ireland) to Hokkaido (Japan) being found in the northern part of Middle Europe, Northern Europe and Russia to the Amur region. In the western parts of the range it is a local and rare species. It is likely extirpated in Britain but a population was recently rediscovered in Ireland. The habitat requirements of the species are a bit unusual, it seems to prefer locally warm deciduous and mixed forests, where birch, the sole host plant, forms the canopy (except Japan, where Sorbus reported). The moth survives winter as a pupa underground.

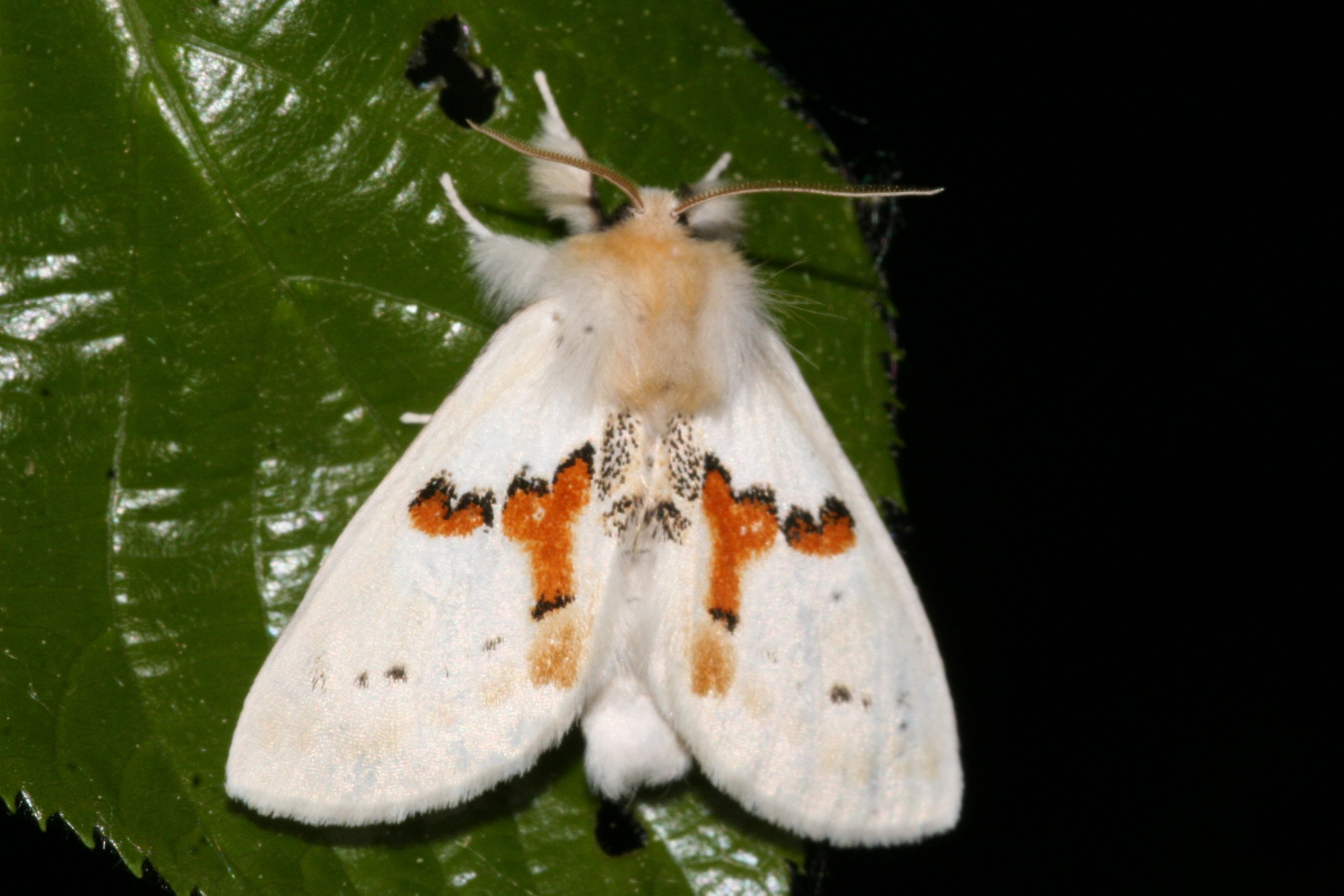

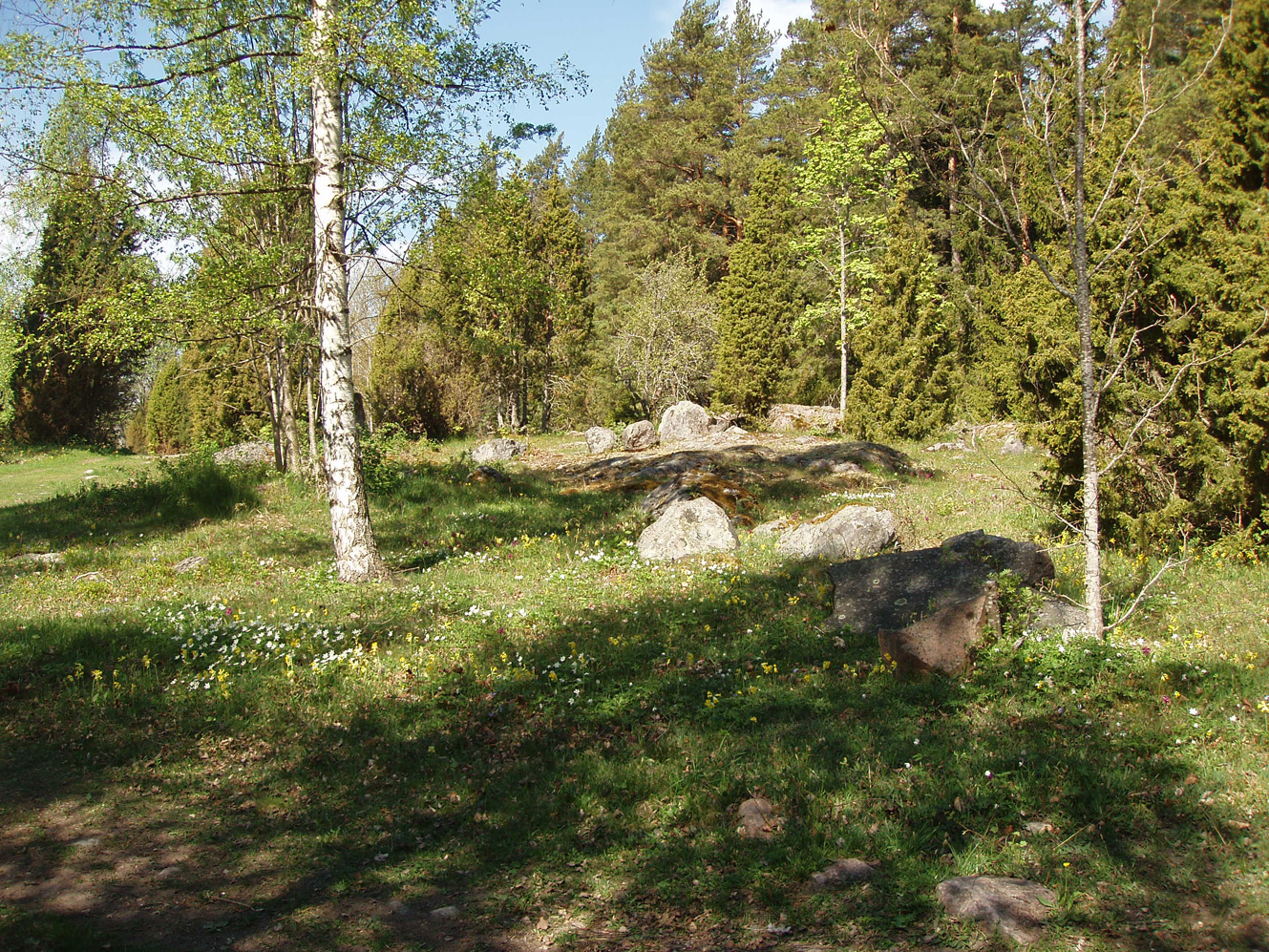
Habitat, Sweden

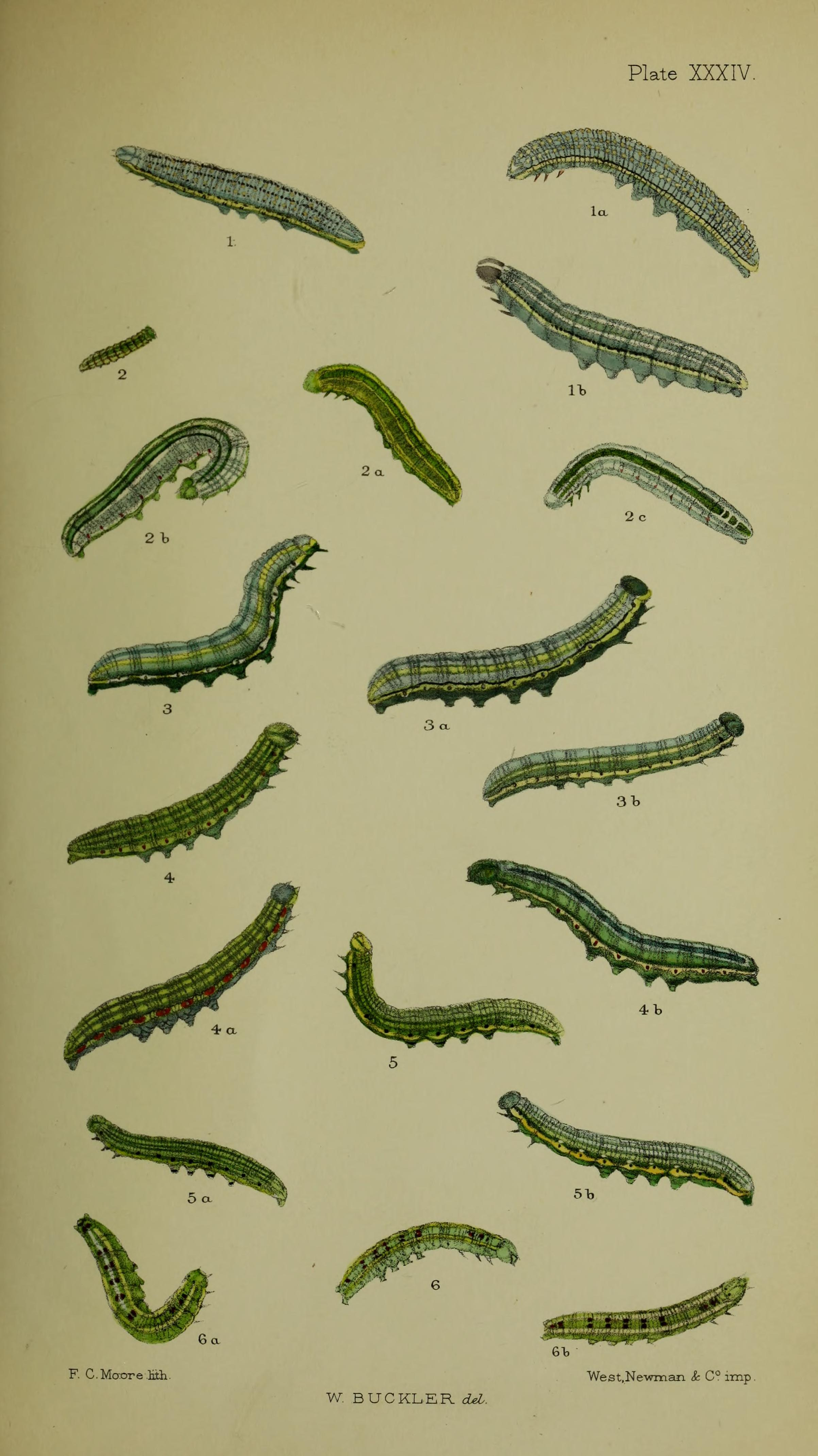
Figs. 5a larvae before last moult 5 5b larvae after last moult

The moths reach a wingspan of 28 to 36 millimeters. They are distinctively patterned. All wings have a snow-white ground color. On the forewings there is a typical, clearly orange-yellow marking approximately in the form of a Y, framed by two other, smaller spots of the same colour. On the outer edge of the forewings there are some small black dots. The lower wings at the inner edge have very fine white hairs.

The egg is flat arched of white, yellowish or light green colour. The caterpillar is smooth with only a few hairs. It is yellow-green, with two dark green, yellowish dorsal lines, as well as black stigmas and golden yellow stripes above the feet. The head is dark green. The pupa is slender and cylindrical, rounded at the end.

== Description in Seitz ==
Pure white, the forewing with a transverse row of bright ochreous, proximally black-edged spots, commencing at the anterior margin of the cell and becoming much wider towards the hind margin; in the distal half a transverse row of blackish spots, of which only the last one is prominent, standing in a broad yellow patch before the hind margin. Collar white or yellow. Central and Eastern Europe in mountainous districts, on the whole sporadic, and rare in many places, northward to the Baltic provinces and Finland, eastward to the Ural and the Carpathians; Amur and Ussuri districts, Japan. — The species occurs in two light forms in Eastern Asia and Russia, albida Bdv., whose forewing is almost without markings, and unicolora Mén., which is entirely white excepting a few black scales in the forewing. The former occurs in Northern Europe as far as Finland, and the latter is found in the Baltic provinces and is the predominant form in Eastern Asia. —Egg slightly convex, glossy, white, yellowish or greenish. Larva glossy, yellowish green, with some darker yellow dorsal longitudinal lines and a similar stripe below the intensely black stigmata; legs and anal claspers ringed with black. July—August on Birch. Pupa black-brown, in a white cocoon on the ground between fallen-off leaves.

== Biology ==
In Central Europe, light birch forests, bogs, as well as warm slopes and heaths with birch trees are the preferred habitat. In Central Europe the moths fly annually in a generation from mid-May to the end of June. They are nocturnal and also fly to artificial light sources. The caterpillars are found from mid-June to the end of August. They feed predominantly on the leaves of birch trees (Betula). Both the moths and the caterpillars prefer to stay in the treetops. Pupation takes place in a web on the earth. The pupa hibernates.
