= Deer of Ireland =

Current and historical species of deer in Ireland

There are four species of deer living wild in Ireland today, namely red deer, fallow deer, sika deer, and the recently introduced Reeve's muntjac, which is becoming established. There have also been scattered reports of roe deer in county Wicklow and county Armagh. The Irish elk and the red deer both became extinct in Ireland about 10,500 years ago during the Nahanagan Stadial. The reindeer was extirpated from Ireland about 9,500 years ago. Many of their skeletal remains have been found well preserved in peat land.

The current red deer population, once thought to have been descendants from the native stock which had come to Ireland at the end of the last ice age, are now believed to have been imported to Ireland by neolithic people around 3300 BC. They almost became extinct again in the 20th century, with only around 60 left, but have now made a comeback to approximately one thousand where the "native" herd has survived in Killarney National Park.

Fallow deer were introduced in Norman times, and now have a population up to 60,000 in the wild. Sika deer were introduced in Powerscourt park in 1860, escaped from captivity, and now number up to 50,000. Scottish roe deer were introduced to the Lissadell Estate in County Sligo around 1870 by Sir Henry Gore-Booth. The Lissadell deer were noted for their occasional abnormal antlers and survived in that general area for about 50 years before they died out, and no roe deer are known to currently exist in Ireland.

== Extinct/extirpated deer species ==
- Irish elk - became extinct about 10,500 years ago
- Reindeer - became extinct in Ireland about 9,500 years ago

== Reintroduced species ==
- Red deer - reintroduced about 3300 BC

== Introduced species ==
- Fallow deer
- Roe deer
- Sika deer
- Reeves's muntjac

== Gallery ==
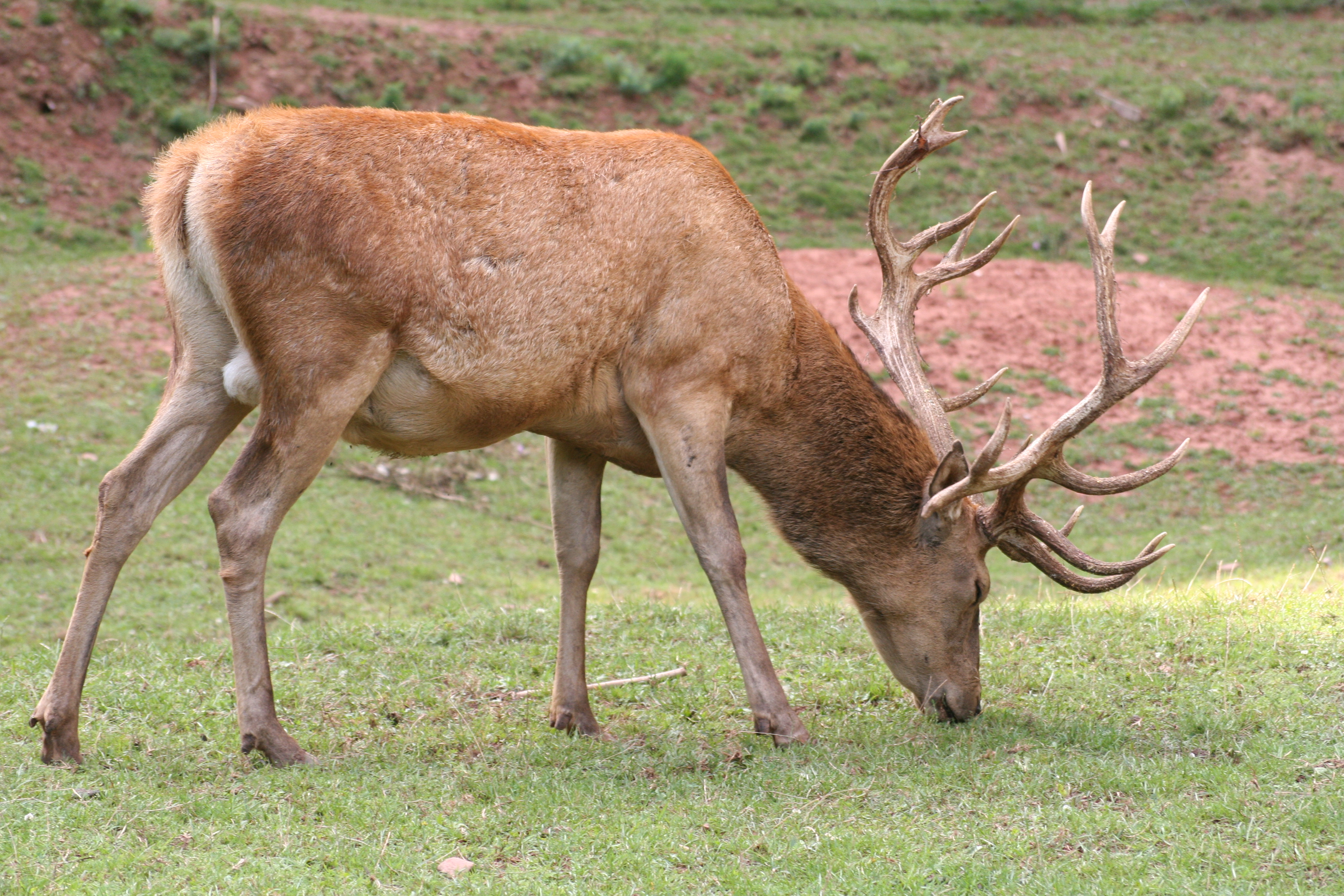
Red deer

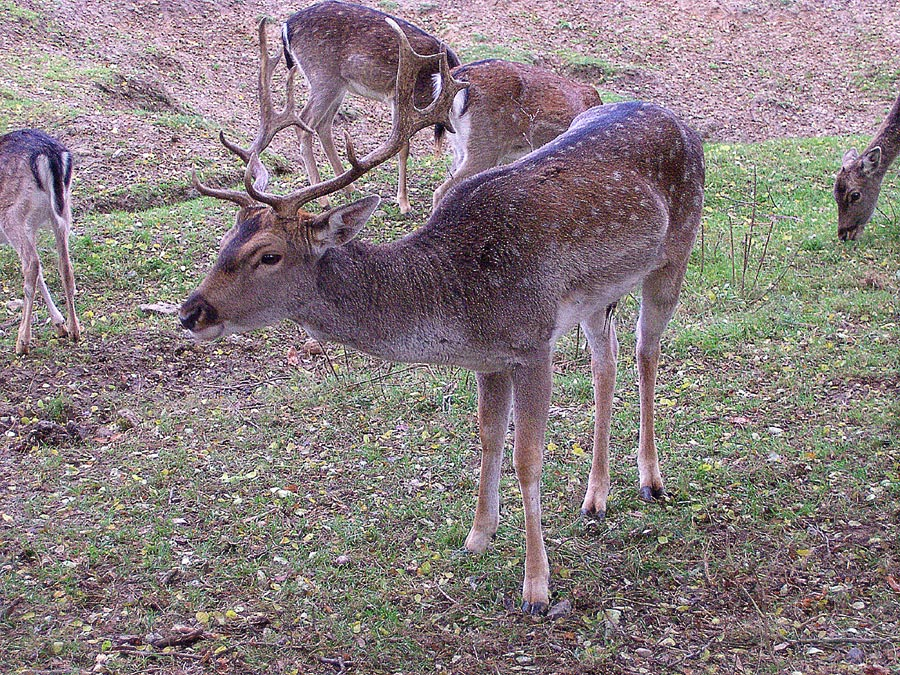
Fallow deer

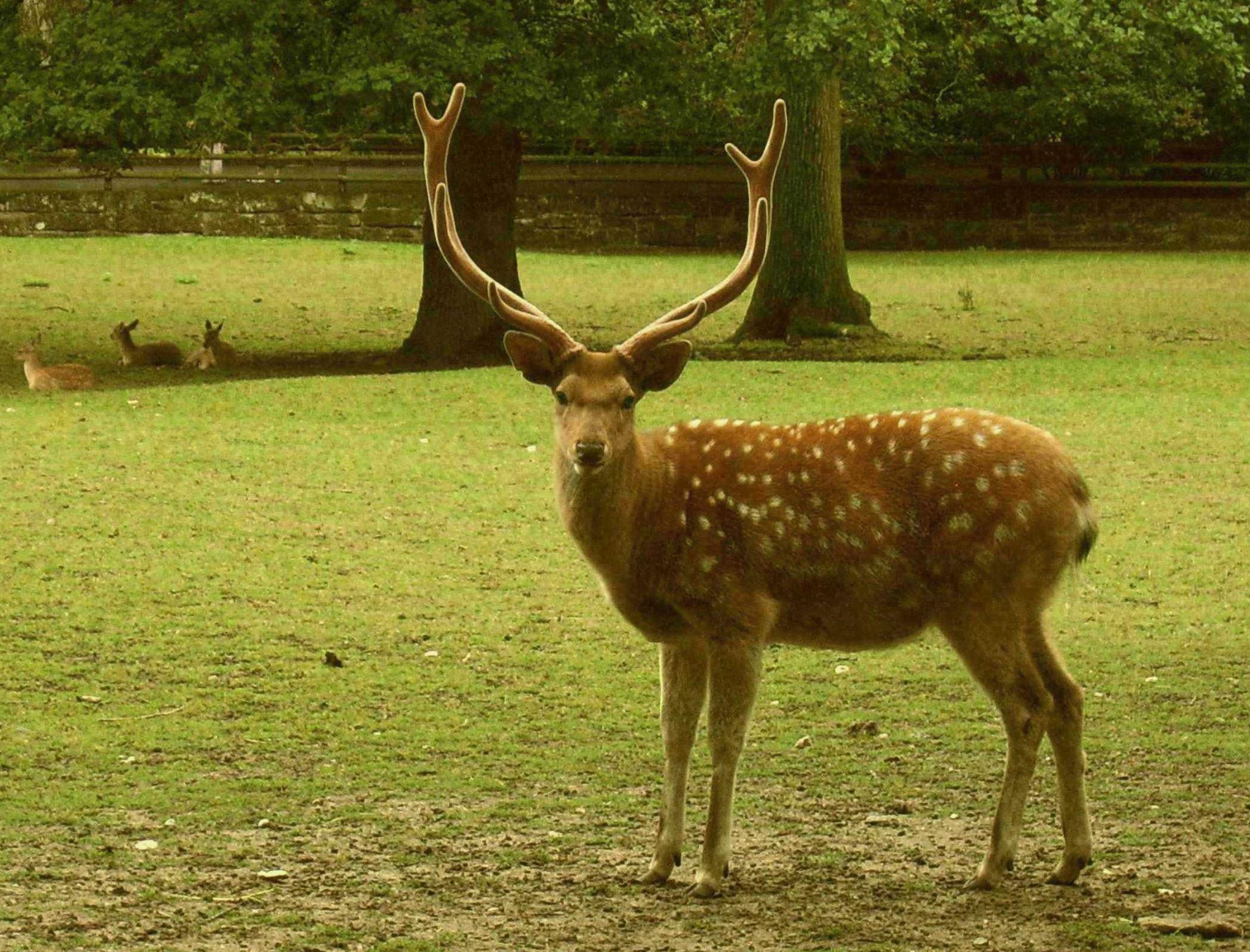
Sika deer

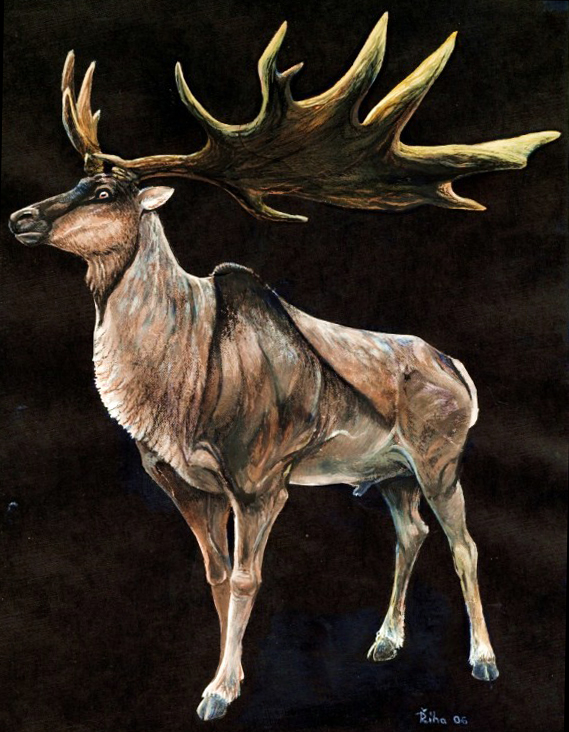
Irish elk

== Valuable reading ==
Butler, F. & Keelleher, C. (eds) (2012). "All-Ireland Mammal Symposium 2009". Irish Naturalists' Journal, Belfast, 90 pp.
