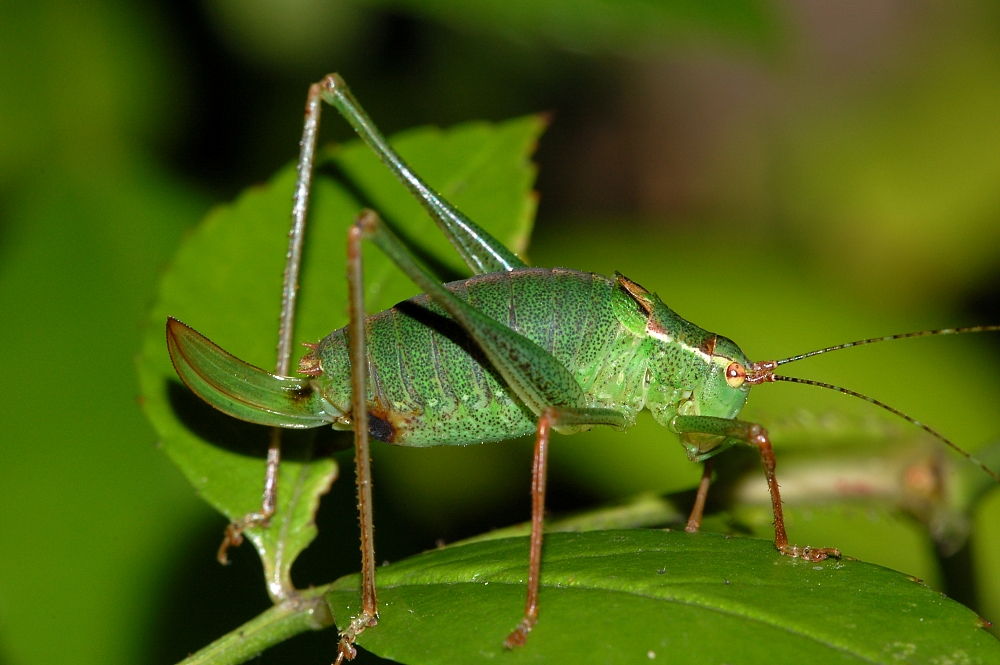
- Female with upwards-curving ovipositor
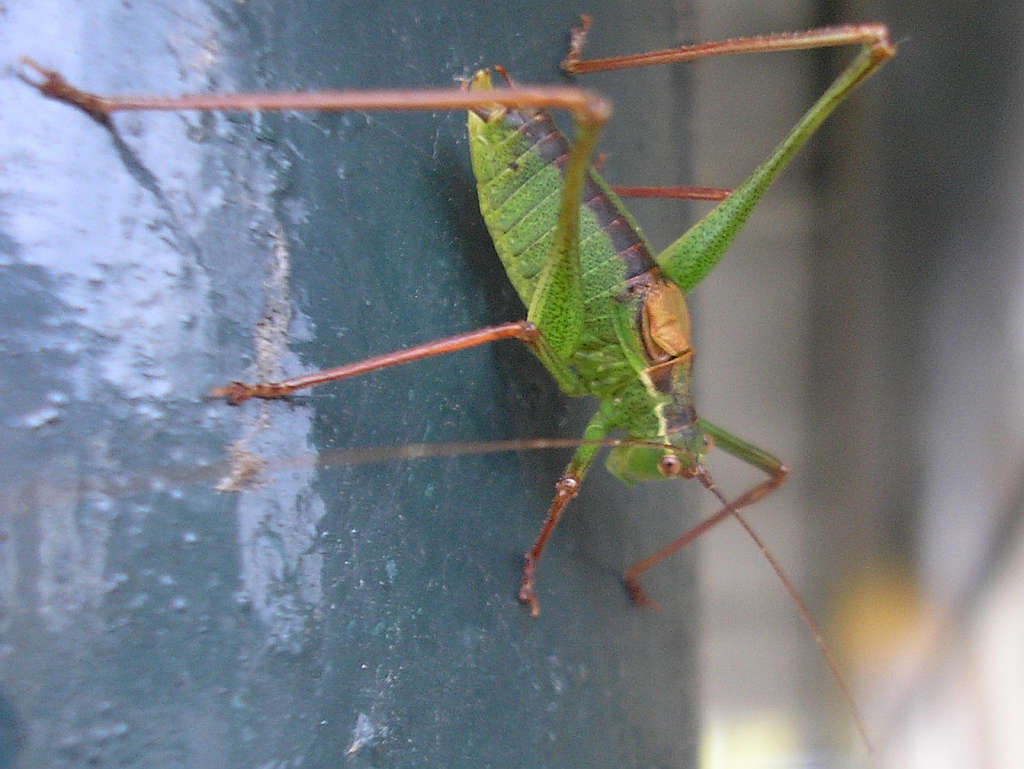
- Male with rudimentary wings on top of his back

Scientific classification
- Kingdom: Animalia
- Phylum: Arthropoda
- Class: Insecta
- Order: Orthoptera
- Suborder: Ensifera
- Family: Tettigoniidae
- Subfamily: Phaneropterinae
- Genus: Leptophyes
- Species: L. punctatissima

Binomial name
- Leptophyes punctatissima (Bosc, 1792)

Synonyms
- List: Locusta punctatissima Bosc, 1792; Barbitistes punctatissima Bosc, 1792; Odontura punctatissima Bosc, 1792; Locusta autumnalis Hagenbach, 1822; Ephippigera glabricauda (Borck, 1848); Leptophyes standishii Miller, 1890; Ephippiger virescens Stephens, 1835; Ephippigera virescens (Stephens, 1835

= Speckled bush-cricket =

Species of cricket-like animal

The speckled bush-cricket (Leptophyes punctatissima) is a flightless species of bush-cricket belonging to the family Tettigoniidae. The species was originally described as Locusta punctatissima in 1792.

== Distribution ==
The speckled bush-cricket is common across much of Europe. It ranges from the British Isles, France, Poland and Belgium in the west to the European parts of Russia in the east, and from southern Scandinavia in the north to southern Italy, Bulgaria and Greece. It has been recorded as far south as Israel. It is also present in the Nearctic realm.

== Habitat ==
This species mainly occurs in dry shrubby environments, in open woodland, in scrub, hedgerows and in gardens, with birch, bramble and gorse. The nymphs can be found in low vegetation while adults are more likely to be found high up in trees.

== Description ==
Sound of Leptophyes punctatissima
Field recording in the Netherlands

The speckled bush-cricket can reach a body length of about 10–15 mm (0.39–0.59 in). It is green with minute black speckles all over its body (more evident in the nymphs), as reflected in the common and Latin name of the species. Its colouring and secretive lifestyle, hidden away in the undergrowth, means that it often passed unnoticed. The dorsal surface of the abdomen features an orange-brown stripe; this is more pronounced in the male than the female. A yellow-white stripe extends backwards from the eyes. The lower legs and feet are brownish. The antennae are twice as long as the body. The species is brachypterous meaning the male's forewings are reduced to small flaps, and those of the female are even more reduced. The hindwings are completely absent, and both males and females are flightless. The female's ovipositor is laterally compressed and curves sharply upwards.

Close-Up of a Leptophyes punctatissima

== Biology ==
Nymphs emerge in May and molt six times before becoming sexually mature in August. Females lay their eggs in late summer in the bark of a tree or a plant stem. The eggs then overwinter before hatching next spring.

The song of the male, produced by rubbing the right wing against a tooth-like projection at the base of the left, is short (1 to 10 ms) and feeble, barely audible to human ears; at a frequency of 40 kHz, it can best be heard with the aid of a bat detector. Unlike other cricket species, the female is able to respond to the male's calls with a weaker call of her own, which attracts the male to her.

The speckled bush-cricket is preyed upon by many predators including bats, birds, lizards, wasps, robber flies, spiders, and small mammals.

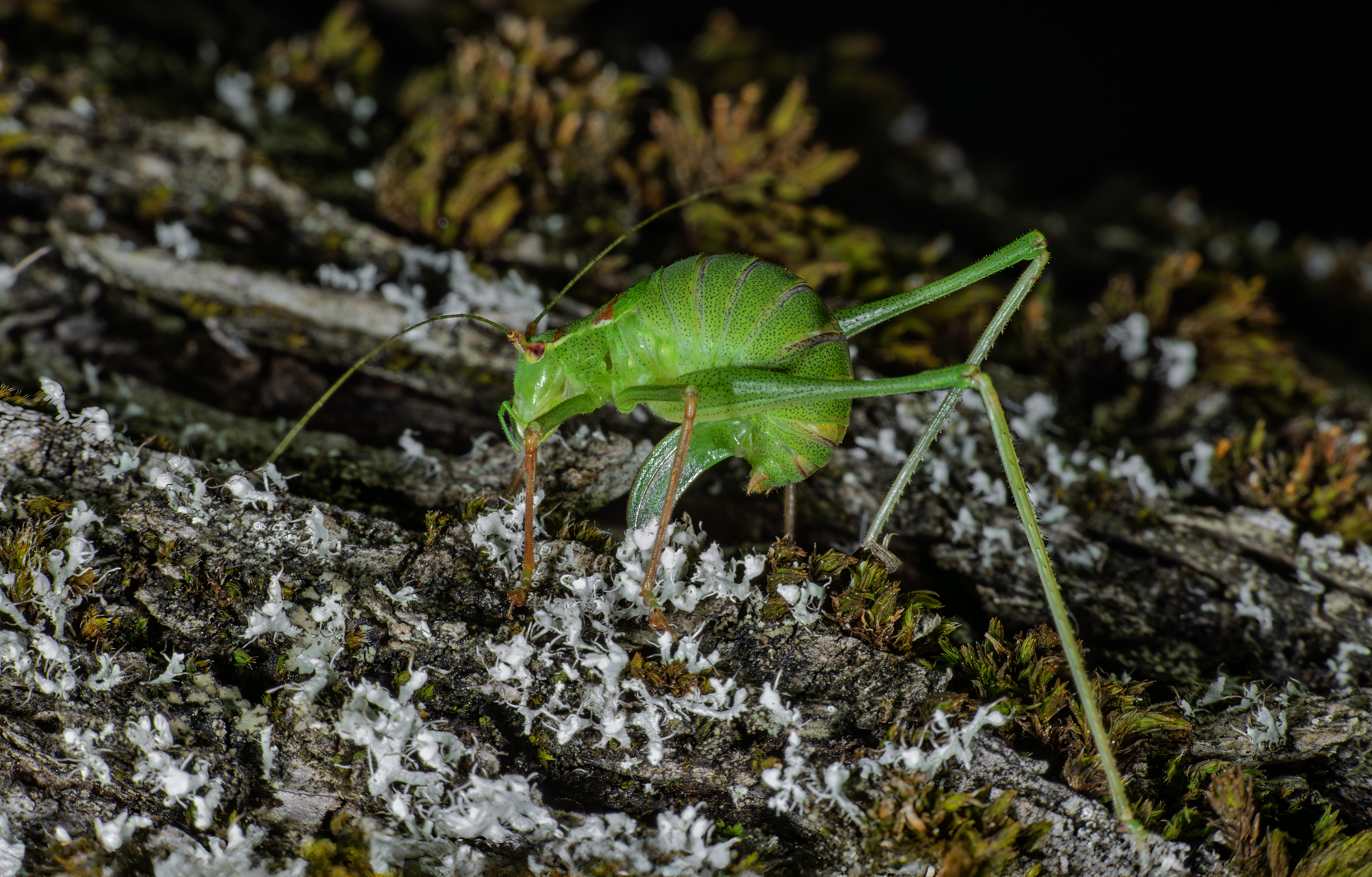
A female laying her eggs.

== Reproduction ==
After reaching sexual maturity around early August, males and females will call out to locate each other. Once found, the female remains stationary while the male pushes himself beneath her. If she rejects him, she will simply move away.

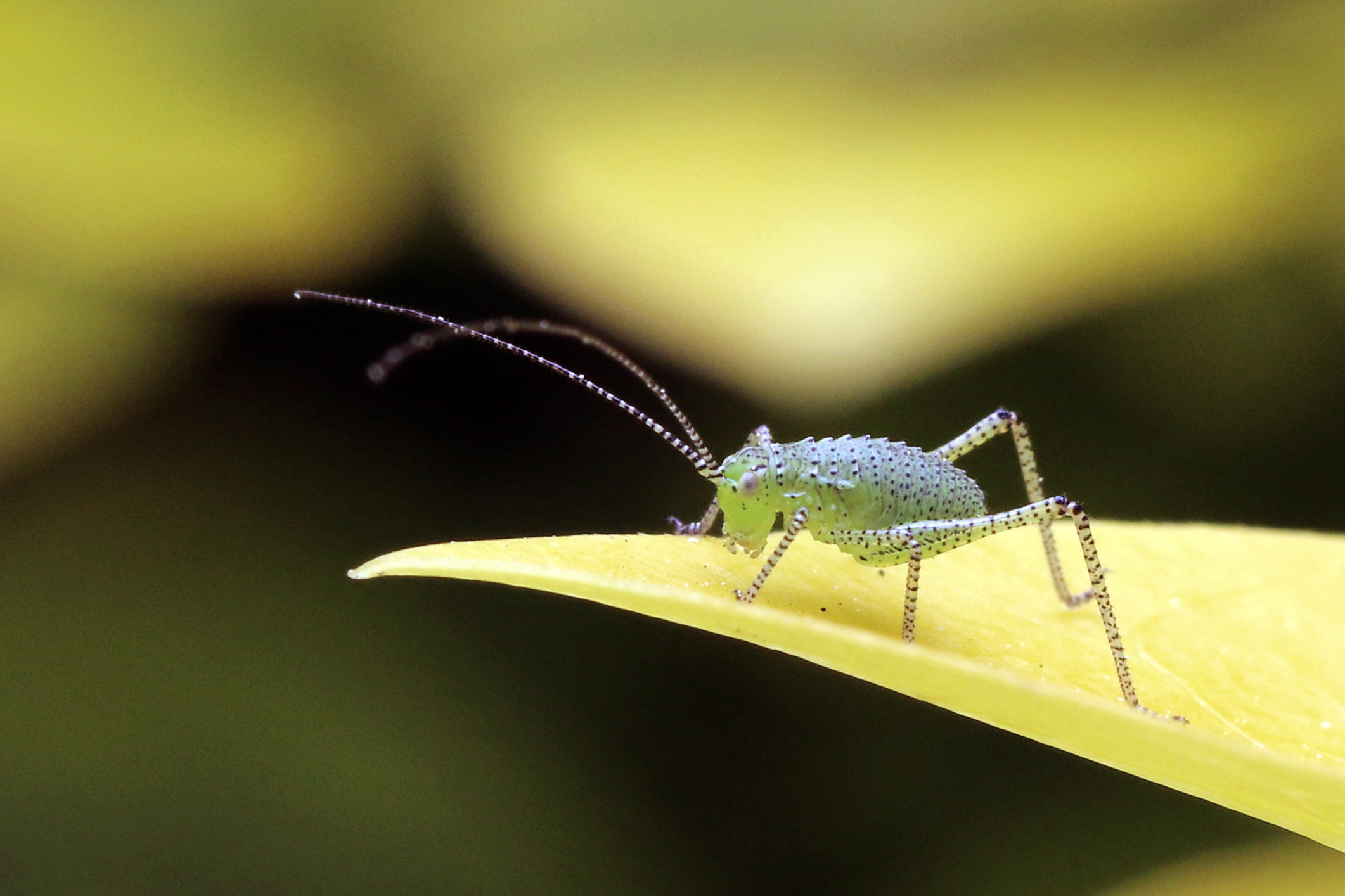
A speckled bush-cricket nymph.

During copulation, the male produces a spermatophore which is surrounded in a edible substance called spermatophylax. Unlike other cricket species, this substance provides no nutritional value and is, instead, thought to protect the sperm from being removed prematurely as well as distract the female from other males. It can take the female between 12 minutes and 2 hours to completely eat the spermatophore. Males will not mate again for at least 24 hours.

The female may start laying eggs as soon as the night after mating. She lays her eggs in tree bark or plant stems. The amount of eggs and how often they are laid over her lifespan varies considerably. For example, some bush-crickets have been observed laying one egg per week, while others were observed laying three eggs per day. Females have been recorded laying between 10 and 185 eggs in their lifetime.
