= SM2 =

SM2 or SM-2 may refer to:

== Media ==
=== Films ===
- Spider-Man 2, the second Spider-Man film released in 2004
- Superman II, the second Superman film released in 1980
- Scary Movie 2, the second Scary Movie film released in 2001

=== Interactive ===
- Super Mario Bros. 2, a 1988 Nintendo Entertainment System game
- Warhammer 40,000: Space Marine 2

=== Music ===
- Spiritual Machines 2, the Our Lady Peace album released in 2021

== Places ==
- SM2, the SM postcode area covering Belmont, South Sutton and East Ewell in England

== Technology ==
=== Military ===
- Pindad SM2, an Indonesian general purpose machine gun
- Standard Missile 2, either of two US missiles:
  - RIM-66 Standard (SM-1MR/SM-2MR), a medium-range surface-to-air missile, the successor of the RIM-24 Tartar missile
  - RIM-67 Standard (SM-1ER/SM-2ER non-VLS capable), an extended range surface-to-air missile, the successor of the RIM-2 Terrier missile
- SM-2, Royal Navy Second Submarine Squadron (motto: "Second to None") Hunter-Killer boats based at HMNB Devonport

=== Software ===
- SM-2 (algorithm), one of the computer algorithms used in SuperMemo
- SM2, a Chinese signature and encryption algorithm, see SM9 (cryptography standard).

=== Transport ===
- VR Class Sm2, a type of commuter train in Finland
- PZL SM-2, a Polish light utility helicopter also known as the WSK SM-2

=== Other ===
- Song Meter SM2, a bird monitoring recorder from Wildlife Acoustics
- SM-2, a research nuclear reactor at Russia's Research Institute of Atomic Reactors
