= Bat species identification =

Bat detectors are the most common way to identify the species of flying bats. There are distinct types of call which can indicate the genus, and variations in pattern and frequency which indicate the species. For readers not familiar with the different types of bat detector, there is further information below and elsewhere.

Bats also make social calls, which are less useful for species identification. They sound different from the echolocation calls and do not have the same frequency patterns. Fuller details on the types of call and other clues to species identification follow below but Pipistrelles (or "Pips") give good examples of what can be discovered with a bat detector and make a good start to learning how to identify bats.

Various backgrounds
Crickets, unidentified mammal, and a bat social call recorded on a heterodyne detector set to 19 kHz - 379Kb, on a small nature reserve in North Devon. None of these calls were audible normally.

Bat detectors pick up various signals in the ultrasound range, not all of which are made by bats. To distinguish bat and bat species it is important to recognise non-bat species.

Captured bats can be exactly identified in the hand but in many countries a licence is required before bats can be captured.

== Types of call ==
There are four basic types of bat echolocation call.

=== FM calls ===
The term "frequency modulation" (FM) refer to the "chirp" type of bat call. On a bat detector it sounds like a sharp click. Tuning a heterodyne detector does not change the sound much, but the level varies.

Heterodyne FM call
A Daubenton's bat hunting over a river - 169 Kb

This is a typical call from a Myotis species. It sounds like hard dry clicks. It was recorded at 40 kHz which was not critical, but this was chosen because it was above the crickets and below Pipistrelles.

=== CF calls ===
These calls were recorded using a heterodyne bat detector tuned to an appropriate frequency.

The constant frequency (CF) call is a series of peeping calls.

Heterodyne CF call
A Lesser Horseshoe bat flying in a barn - 63 Kb

The bat emits the calls at a constant frequency, but the heterodyne bat detector exaggerates the doppler effect as it flies.

=== Hockey stick calls ===
Some bats call with a composite call, starting with an FM component and ending in a constant frequency. This is often called a "hockey stick" call from its appearance on a spectrogram.

Heterodyne FM + CF call
A Typical hockey stick call with a ploppy sound as heard on a heterodyne bat detector - 68 Kb

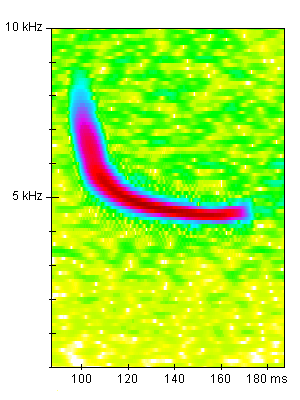
Pipistrelle spectrogram

The Pipistrelle call is an example of a "hockey stick" composite type FM and CF call with a fast falling frequency FM part ending with a constant frequency, CF section.

A spectrogram is a graphic representation of frequencies against time. The colour represents the loudness of each frequency. This spectrogram shows a falling call which becomes a steady note. The yellow and green blotches are noise.

Hockey stick call slowed down
A single Pipistrelle call slowed down 256 times or 8 octaves - 22Kb

On a heterodyne detector this sounds like a ploppy click, but when it is slowed down by eight octaves, a sharply falling call can be heard, slowing to a single note.

A heterodyne bat detector will only handle a small range of bat frequencies, so it is necessary to keep retuning the heterodyne frequency to find the point of maximum loudness or, in the case of bats with a hockey stick call, the frequency which gives the lowest sound. This gives the lowest plop sound from the CF end of the calls.

==== Using a heterodyne bat detector ====
A heterodyne bat detector simply downshifts the bat frequencies by the amount shown on the dial or the display on the more posh detectors. For instance with a hockey stick call ending at 45 kHz, this will produce a near zero end frequency when tuned to 45 kHz, If it is tuned too low, or too high, the difference frequency rises as illustrated in Tuning the heterodyne in the Pipistrelle section below. It will only reproduce a limited range of frequencies, typically only 10 kHz out of a bat spectrum of over 90 kHz.

A heterodyne bat detector does not give a very accurate measurement of the frequency of a bat call, One reason is that the call frequencies can easily vary by 1 kHz or more due to the doppler shift. To track these changes and to get a more precise frequency, a frequency division bat detector or a time expansion bat detector is used using a computer with sound analysis software. Time expansion detectors are beyond the scope of this article but are described in bat detector

==== Using a frequency division bat detector ====
A frequency division bat detector analyses each bat call and re-synthesises it at typically a tenth of its frequency to make them audible as explained in the bat detector article. It can produce anomalies with sounds with a random structure and can only process periodic or tonal calls with a measurable frequency, but a recording can be used to measure the frequency of all parts of the bat call using a spectrogram display as illustrated below.

A FD detector does not require manual tuning as it works on a full range of bat frequencies, but some, like the Duet, also have a heterodyne detector built in. The entire call is preserved and can be recorded on an audio recorder and studied later on a computer. A spectrogram and other analysis software can also show the repetition rates and patterns of the calls which is also useful for species identification.

This is what a Pipistrelle sounds like on a frequency division bat detector:

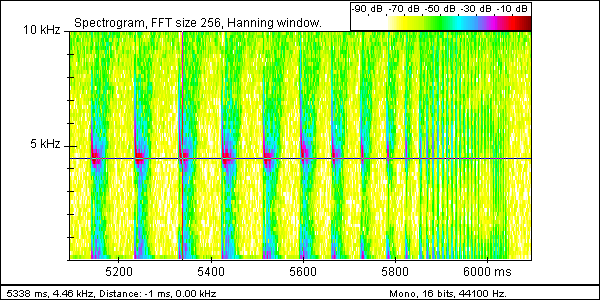
Pipistrelle spectrogram with feeding buzz

Pipistrelle on a FD detector
A Pipistrelle flying and feeding over a pond on a Devon farm - 225 Kb

The sound is different from a heterodyne recording and is a squeaky "teek" a bit more like a heterodyne tuned off frequency. With an FD detector the user cannot easily tell the difference between 45s and 55s by ear.

And this is what that recording looks like on a spectrogram up to the feeding buzz.

We can measure the end frequency (selected) which comes out as 44.6 kHz after multiplying by 10. The call rate speeds up as a food target is approached ending in a very rapid "feeding buzz". Note that the call becomes FM only during the feeding buzz.

=== Social calls ===
This is a wide subject and there is still a lot to be discovered about bat social communication and how they use social calls in roosts and when flying. Generally a bat social call is not tonal, in other words it does not consist of a musical type note. Some bat detectors do not produce an accurate recording of a bat social call. Typically bat social calls use a lower frequency range than echolocation calls, and can thus be heard further away. Sometimes a bat will make a social call while echolocating which can cause confusion.

Pipistrelle Social and Echolocation calls on a FD Detector

We can see and hear how the lower frequency social calls are heard at a greater distance than the higher echolocation calls as the bat approaches and departs. Zooming in on a spectrogram, social calls are atonal and repeated rapidly about five times in each call. The social calls are interleaved between the echolocation calls. They show a ragged frequency distribution around 20 kHz. Note the FD detector divides frequencies by 10.

The echolocation calls are single "hockey stick" calls at a higher repetition rate. At this scale the hockey stick shape is not very clear, but the end frequency can be measured as 45.2 kHz. A doppler shift is recorded as the bat approaches. The frequency was measured as it passes.

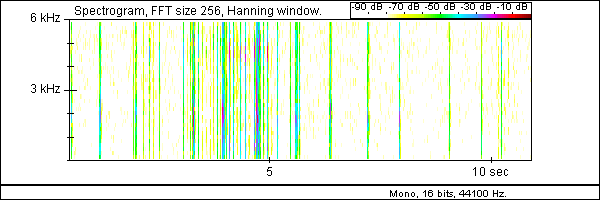
FD Spectrogram of social and echolocation calls. The spectrogram shows combined slower social calls with faster echolocation calls at a higher frequency.

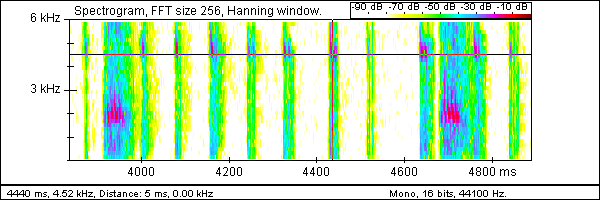
FD Spectrogram detail of social and echolocation calls

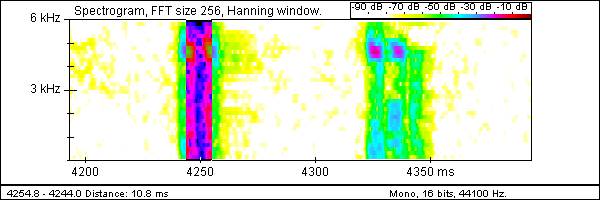
FD Spectrogram of echo on calls. This is further zoomed in on two echolocation calls. They appear double due to an echo. The selected portion is 10.8 ms, giving a path length difference of 10.8 times 340 m/s or about 3.7 metres. Note the timings are not altered by the frequency division.

=== Flying speed ===
Calculating flying speed involves some technicalities. A spectrogram can easily reveal a doppler shift in a passing bat. A heterodyne detector will show some shifts in the calls above, but doppler shifts are most readily heard in CF calls such as the Horseshoe's. A rough estimate the speed of a bat can be made from the doppler shift as it flies past. The rule of thumb is that at around 50 kHz a shift is 1 kHz indicates about 6.8 metres per second (15 mph). A passing bat will produce a total shift of about double this.

The Pipistrelles below showed an estimated shift of around 1.5 kHz indicating a speed just over 5 m/s or a bit under 14 mph (23 km/h).

== UK species ==
This section is also a practical introduction to the recognition of bat species, using Pipistrelles as an example. More detailed and technical information is given below.

Seventeen species of bat are regarded as resident in the UK. The species most often seen and heard are the Common Pipistrelle and the Soprano Pipistrelle, and are a good reference point for comparison with other bat species. In fact it is worth taking time to get familiar with the various calls of the two common species.

=== Soprano Pipistrelle Pipistrellus pygmaeus ===
These two species are considered together here. This section also acts as a tutorial for analysing bat calls. The only technical knowledge needed is that kHz is the number dialled into a bat detector.

These two pips are distinct species but the frequencies of their calls are very variable and are not an exact indication of the species. They are frequently referred to as "45 Pips" and "55 Pips" from the calls as heard on a heterodyne detector.

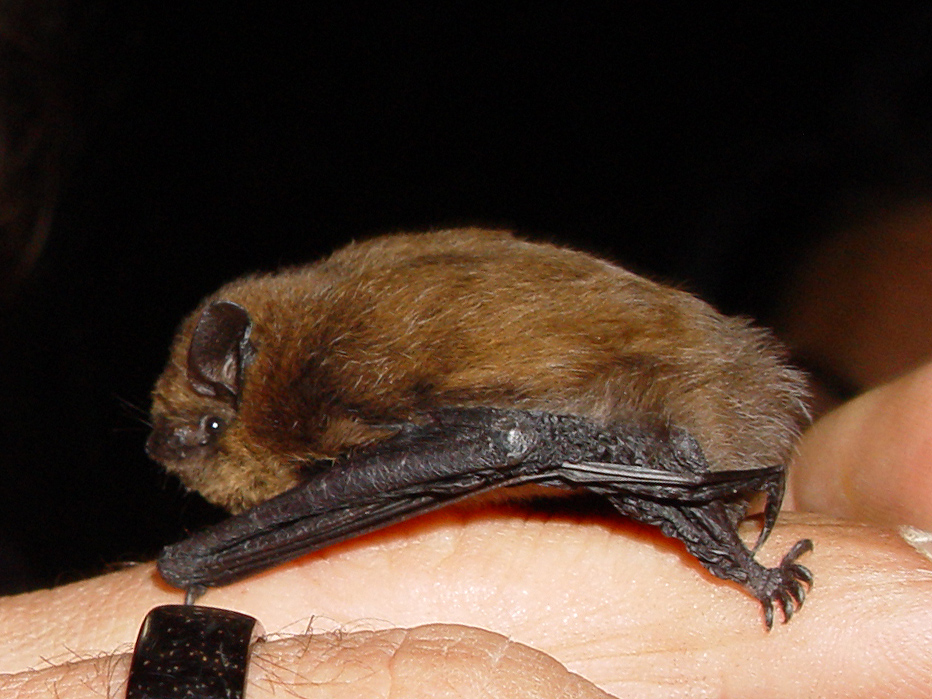
Common Pipistrelle

Heterodyne Common Pipistrelle
Common Pipistrelle call heard on a heterodyne bat detector - 68Kb

Note the "ploppy" sound of the call and the "feeding buzzes" as it homed in on insects. The Soprano Pipistrelle's call sounds very similar, but at a higher frequency setting on the heterodyne bat detector.

==== Tuning the heterodyne ====
As heterodyne bat detector only shifts a limited range of bat call frequencies, it needs to be constantly retuned so as not to miss some species and to identify those heard. One solution sometimes used in bat surveys is to use a second heterodyne detector tuned to a different frequency to detect other species such as Horseshoe bats if these are likely to be present. With Pipistrelles, if it is tuned too low or too high, the difference frequency rises as illustrated in the following example.

Tuning to a Pipistrelle hockey stick call
Four typical hockey stick calls: 1) tuned at CF frequency; 2) tuned low; 3) tuned high; 4) back to CF frequency - 213 Kb

The first and last sections of this edited recording at about the same frequency as the last part of the hockey stick call, This produces a deeper and wetter ploppy sound. The second section is with the detector tuned too low - this brings the end frequency up and gives a squeaky click sound. The third section is with the detector tuned too high and also gives a squeaky sound but a bit harder. By tuning up and down, the deepest sound as in the fourth section is again produced, and this indicates the approximate frequency of the end of the bat's call. This is important for species identification.

==== 45 and 55 Pips ====
To distinguish between P. pipistrellus and P. pygmaeus, if a call is around 45 kHz it is a Common Pipistrelle and around 55 kHz it is a Soprano. The rare P. nathusii calls at around 39 kHz and so is easier to distinguish. The problem is that there seems to be an almost continuous spectrum of Pip frequencies from 43 kHz to 59 kHz. More studies need to be done on the call frequency ranges of each species.

Another small problem with differing frequencies is the doppler shift and a Pip passing by at 3.4 m/s (8 MPH) will show a doppler shift of about 1 kHz.

For bat workers with a suitable licence, an examination in the hand or close up, shows distinct characteristics between the 45 and 55 Pips:

- Muzzle colour and shape
  - P.p has a more bulbous muzzle and darker fur.
- Set of eyes
  - P.p has eyes more deeply set in dark fur.
  - P.pg has thinner fur or bare skin next to the eyes.
- Wing venation
  - This is difficult to distinguish and can only be seen on a captured bat. If this check is held to be definitive, it does not always correlate with a definite call frequency criterion.

==== Resolving calls ====
The following recording was made on a Duet combined heterodyne and FD detector. The heterodyne frequency was 53 kHz and the corresponding track sounds like this:

Heterodyne muddled calls
Heterodyne recording set to 53 kHz - 133Kb

What can be heard is a lot of background noise from crickets and a rather muddled pass by what is probably a pipistrelle.

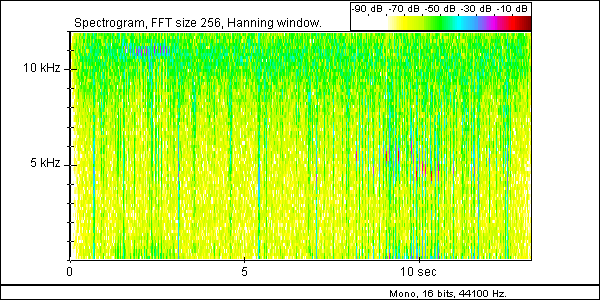
FD detector whole track

A spectrogram of the FD track reveals what happened:

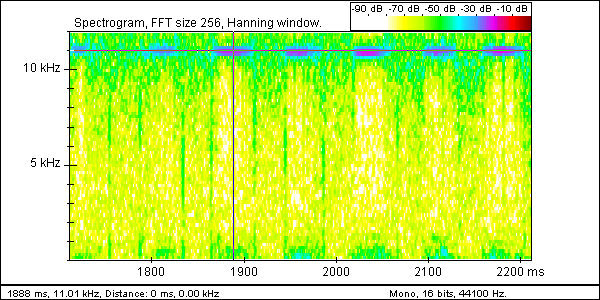
FD detector Lesser Horseshoe pass

Another bat was completely missed by the heterodyne detector which was set to the wrong frequency for that bat. It was a Lesser Horseshoe emerging from its roost.

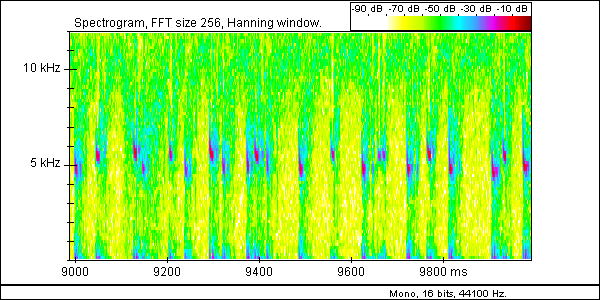
FD detector two Pips pass

The muddle following the LHS resolves into two Pipistrelles flying together with frequencies of 47.7 kHz and 54.5 kHz, in other words, a Common and a Soprano Pipistrelle.

Three bats have thus been positively identified using an FD recording

These three bats would not have been identified by a heterodyne bat detector. From other recordings taken at the time, the insistent "chuck" sound was associated with the Soprano Pipistrelle at around 20 kHz, which habitually made this social call while flying. This is where an FD detector falls down as it regenerated the social call at around 40 kHz. FD detectors can only process tonal calls with a measurable frequency and not calls which have a random frequency pattern.

=== Space for other bat species ===
In preparation

== Non-bat sounds ==
A whole world of ultrasound opens up when a bat detector is switched on. To distinguish bat and bat species it is important to recognise non-bat species. The following minimally edited recording was made in a small nature reserve in North Devon, UK, in September. None of these calls were audible normally.

However, the cheat here is that the last sound is from a bat which is making a social call as it flies.

Various backgrounds
Crickets, unidentified mammal, and a bat social call recorded on a heterodyne detector set to 19 kHz - 379Kb

=== Rodents and insectivores ===
Mice, voles and shrews emit ultrasound calls which can sometimes be mistaken for bat social calls. Sometimes other clues must be used to be certain, such as a sound coming and going as a bat flies past.

=== Crickets ===
Crickets make a distinctive sound both audibly and in ultrasound. Some species cannot be heard by the human ear. In the height of summer, they can mask out bat calls and interfere with spectrogram analysis. They can trigger "voice activated" recorders which can be very annoying when listening back later. This is the other relationship between cricket and bat.

Cricket chorus
Several species of ultrasound crickets recorded on a heterodyne bat detector set to 19 kHz - 169Kb

Note the reaction of one cricket when approached by a bat detector.

=== Background noises ===
There is an irreducible hiss in the background of every bat detector recording. This is "system noise" from the microphone and electronics. This can vary widely between bat detectors and various types of bat detectors. Footsteps and contents of pockets like keys and small change can be very noisy at ultrasound frequencies. Wind in trees is often less of a problem as this noise is absorbed by air at a distance.

== More detailed notes ==
=== Distance range of bat calls ===
Higher sound frequencies are absorbed by the air over a distance. The amount of absorption depends on the frequency and the humidity of the air. This is why close thunder crackles and distant thunder rumbles; the air has absorbed the higher frequencies.

At bat echolocation frequencies, air absorption limits the range both for the bat and for bat detectors. Typically at around 50 kHz the sound level halves every six metres, or put more technically, it is absorbed at around 1 dB per metre. In practice this puts the maximum range of a bat detector at around 30 metres and a bat's ability to locate any object at roughly 20 metres. These are very approximate figures and bats which call at lower frequencies can hear and be heard at much greater distances. Conversely a bat like the Lesser Horseshoe which calls mainly at about 110 kHz is more difficult to detect over 10 metres.

Directionality of the ultrasonic sensor in the bat detector can also have a large effect on detection distance. A highly directional sensor such as the Polaroid element will have significantly decreased distance detection if the bat is not in front of the sensor. The directionality of the actual bat call also varies widely from species to species and can affect detection distance.

With a small target like an insect, the level of the reflection coming back falls with the inverse fourth power of the distance. In other words, at twice the distance, the level falls 16 times. This puts the maximum range at which a bat can detect an insect in metres. A large object such as a tree, a building or the ground can be detected by the bat at much greater distances.

=== Types of bat call ===
The three basic types of bat call described and illustrated above provide different information to the bat. We cannot know what the bat actually hears, but research is continuing on what a bat can hear and discriminate. A bat does not receive a detailed image like a visual image although it has good eyesight as well, but essentially any ultrasound image it detects will be defocused due to the comparatively long wavelengths of the sound frequencies used. At 50 kHz, the wavelength is about 7 mm. It is remarkable how well a bat can echolocate.

=== Frequency modulation ===
This is a rapidly falling whistle note and is used by most bat species. An FM call gives a very precise time measurement and enables a bat to detect distances to the accuracy of tens of centimetres. This technique is also used in radars where it has advantages over a very short pulse. As with radar itself, it was discovered that bats had been using these techniques for millions of years before man "invented" it.

=== Constant frequency ===
The Horseshoe bats Rhinolophus spp. use a mainly CF call. This is heard as a characteristic peeping sound on a bat detector. The frequency of the emitted call depends on the species and gives an immediate identification. Their call is not completely CF as it starts and ends with a "grunt" as can be seen on a spectrogram.

A CF call does not give a precise distance measurement. It however gives a precise relative speed measurement due to the doppler effect. A "beep" lasting 60 milliseconds gives a linear length of the call of about 20 metres, thus if a target is less than 10 metres distance, the echo will start to return while the bat is still emitting the call.

The doppler effect of the CF call from a moving bat is greatly exaggerated by a heterodyne bat detector. This can be used to estimate the speed of a flying bat or to identify bats which are echolocating while roosting.

A bat call from a bat approaching or departing at 6.8 metres per second (15 mph) calling at 50 kHz will typically show a doppler shift of +- 1 kHz and pro rats. This can cause uncertainty with some species such as Pipistrelles.

=== Composite FM and CF ===
Some species such as the Pipistrelles start their call with an FM component but the rate of change of frequency slows to an almost CF end part. On a spectrogram, his appears as a "hockey stick" shape.

This in effect gives the best of both worlds, enabling precise distance and speed measurement. Some species alternate calls with and without a CF component, and Pipistrelles usually use an FM only call at short ranges.

== Detecting bats ==
=== Acoustic bat detectors ===
There is a range limitation with this method because of the absorption of ultrasound by air. For many bat species the range limit is around 30 metres, but it can be much less with Horseshoe bats and Long-eared bats.

=== Visual identification ===
Bats fly mostly at night but some indication of the species by sight at dusk or dawn can be given by size, flight patterns and proximity to known roosts. An example is when doing a bat roost emergence count at dusk when the likely species is further confirmed using an acoustic bat detector. The range limit depends on the light, surroundings and the night vision of the observer.

=== Infrared ===
Infrared imaging enables bats to be observed without causing them disturbance. This requires an IR illuminator such as a spotlight with a suitable filter or an IR LED emitter. Observation is done by IR binoculars or by IR CCTV. Some home camcorders made by Sony are sensitive to IR enabling an IR video recording to be made at low cost. The range limit is set by the illuminator and the definition of the imager. Species recognition is only by estimating size and by flight patterns. The power of an IR floodlight drops rapidly with distance, and a spotlight will miss bats not in the beam.

=== Thermal Imaging ===
A bat has to be warm to fly and emits heat of the order of 1 watt when flying, depending on size. The range is limited as with IR detection by the definition of the thermal imager. Affordable imagers will not detect distant bats and this method is unlikely to be better than IR illumination except with the most expensive high definition equipment.

=== Ground radar ===
Fixed ground radar is used to detect birds flying near aircraft. Bird/Aircraft Strike Hazard (BASH) systems are deployed at airfields. Mobile BASH installations are still in the development stage and await further research with bats. They are very expensive to deploy and the licensing arrangements for mobile zoological ground radars is unknown. Anecdotal reports suggest that the most sophisticated radar systems with detection software can identify the presence of bats at a range of around 1 kilometre. The near limit with radars is more distant than the maximum range of the above methods and there may be a substantial distance gap between these systems and radar in which bats cannot be observed.
