= EM3 =

The term EM3 may refer to:

- Exploration Mission-3 (EM-3), former name of Artemis III, a planned mission for NASA's Artemis program
- Echo Meter EM3, a handheld active bat detector manufactured by US company Wildlife Acoustics
- e-M3, a test electric vehicle developed by Croatian company Rimac Automobili
- EM-3, a proposed experimental British assault rifle, a precursor of the EM-2 rifle
- EM3, or Electrician's Mate 3rd Class, an enlisted rate in the US Navy and US Coast Guard
- EM3, a category for streaming pupils formerly used in education in Singapore
