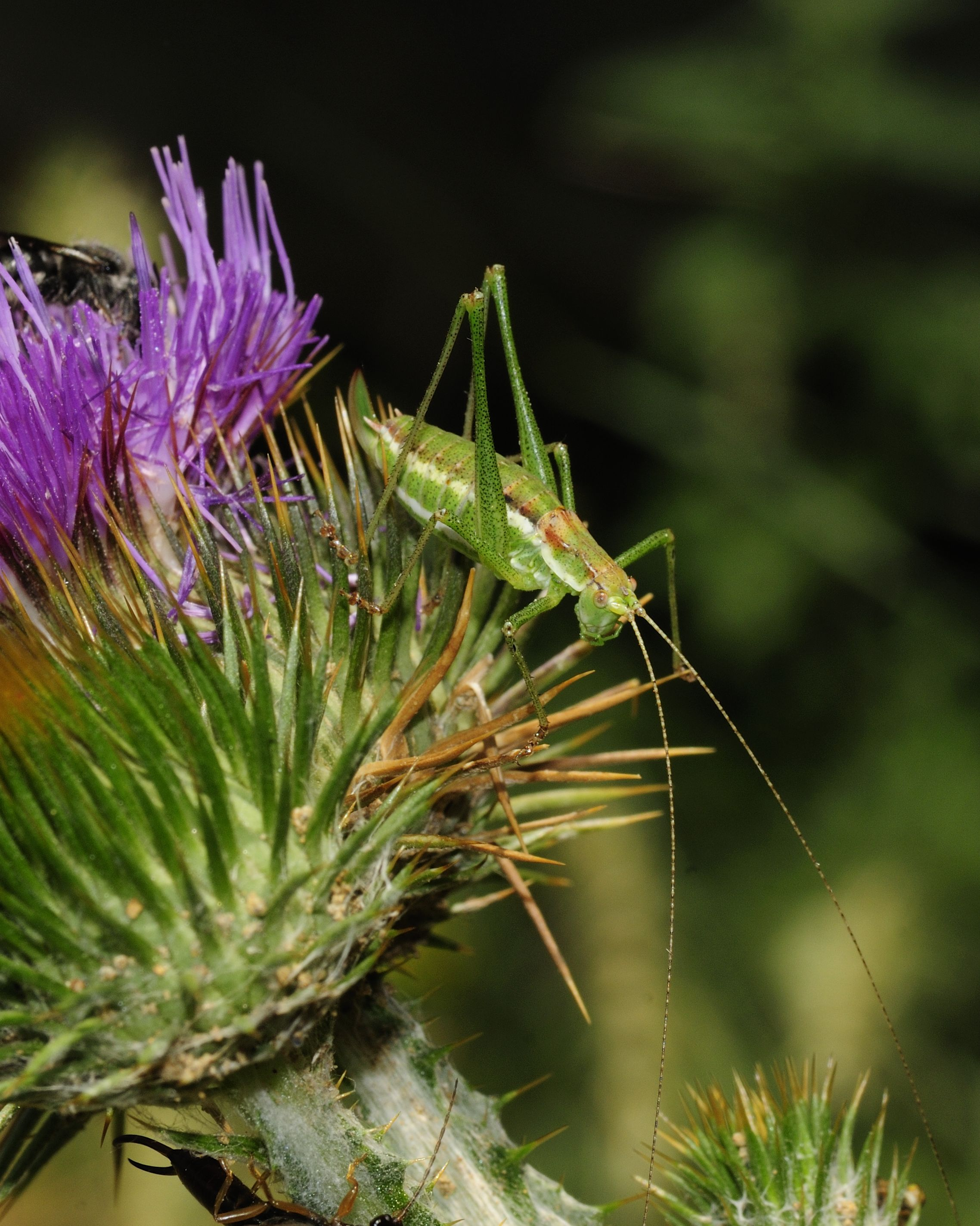

Scientific classification
- Domain: Eukaryota
- Kingdom: Animalia
- Phylum: Arthropoda
- Class: Insecta
- Order: Orthoptera
- Suborder: Ensifera
- Family: Tettigoniidae
- Subfamily: Phaneropterinae
- Genus: Leptophyes
- Species: L. albovittata

Binomial name
- Leptophyes albovittata (Kollar, 1833).

= Leptophyes albovittata =

Species of cricket-like animal

Leptophyes albovittata is a species belonging to the family Tettigoniidae, subfamily Phaneropterinae. It is found in Europe east of France and Spain. mainly in Eastern Europe . To the west, the border runs along the line Würzburg-Nördlingen-Munich. The species feeds on delicate and soft-leaved plants, such as chickweed, dandelion and Lathyrus.

Close-Up of a Leptophyes albovittata
