= Wildlife Acoustics =

American bioacoustic monitoring company

Wildlife Acoustics, Inc. is a privately held United States company based in Maynard, Massachusetts. The company provides bioacoustics monitoring technology for scientists, researchers, and government agencies internationally. The company was founded by Ian Agranat in 2003. The company originally developed a product called the Song Sleuth, a device that would attempt to automatically identify birds from their songs in real time in the field. As this concept proved too expensive for the consumer market, the underlying technology was used to develop autonomous acoustic and ultrasonic recorders and analysis software for research scientists and other professional ecologists.

== Products ==
Song Meter mounted on a tree.

=== Song Meter SM Mini and SM Mini Bat ===
Launched in early 2020, the Song Meter Mini and Mini Bat are Wildlife Acoustics' smallest bioacoustics recorders. The Mini records in the acoustic range so is aimed at recording birds, amphibians, soundscapes and other natural sounds within human hearing. The Mini Bat records in ultrasound and is aimed at recording bats. As well as its very compact size, its main feature is that the user can check battery and SD card status and configure it using an iOS or Android mobile device via bluetooth. It can run for 240 hours from four AA batteries. There are some preset configurations such as run continuously, run for two hours at dawn and dusk, run for five minutes every hour, etc. Users can also create their own custom schedules and then upload these onto the recorder. The recorder comes with one microphone but there is space for a second (needs to be bought separately).

=== Song Meter Micro 2 ===
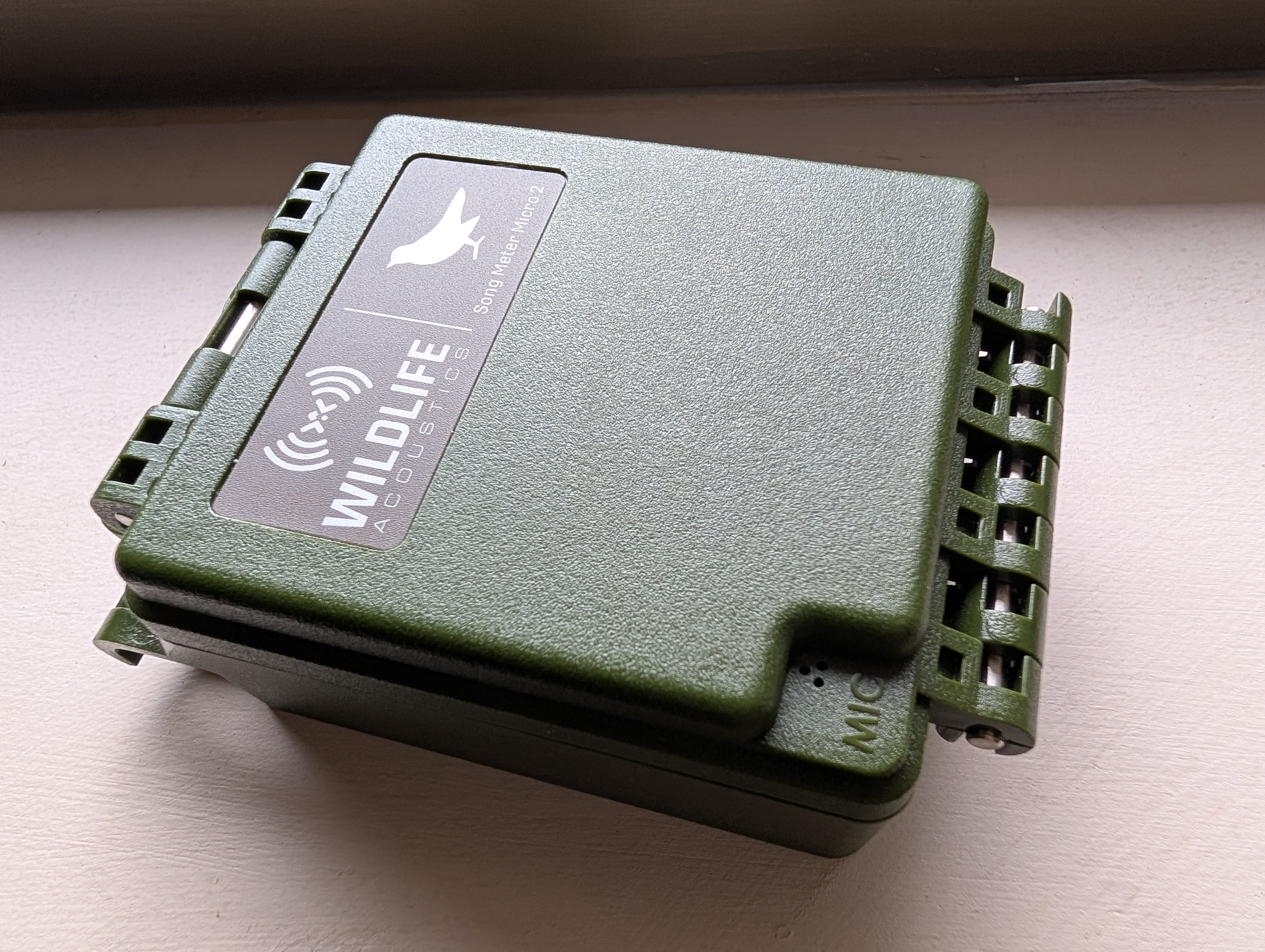
Song Meter Micro 2 Weatherproof housing

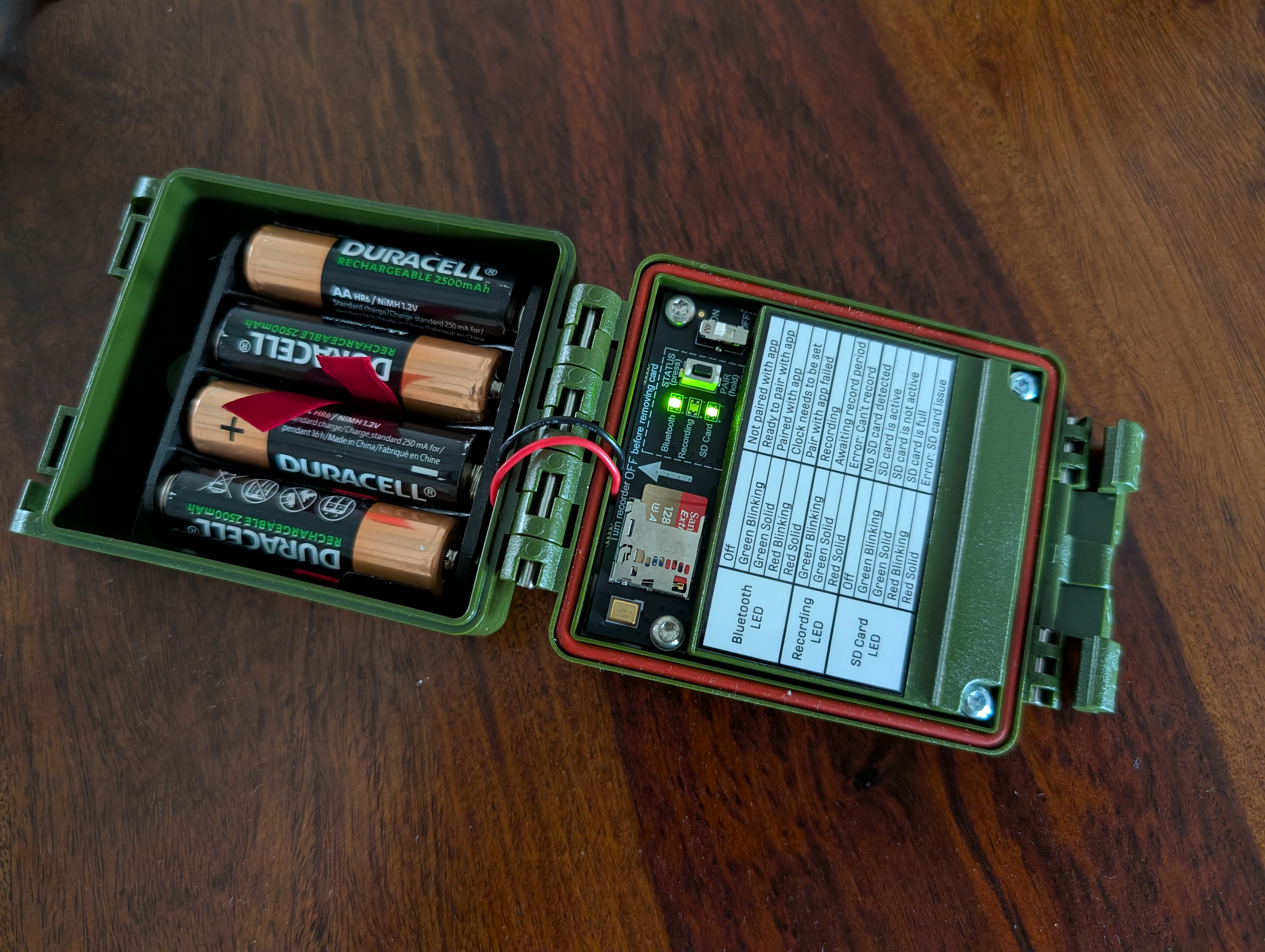
Song Meter Micro 2 device open showing batteries and recorder

This is a compact acoustic recorder that can be used to record birds, amphibians, insects, and general soundscapes. The microphone is capable of a sample rate from 8 kHz to 256 kHz. The device works on 4 AA alkaline or rechargeable NiMH batteries with a recording life of 280 hours. Both desktop computer and mobile smartphone applications (iOS and Android) can be used to configure the device. The Song Meter Micro 2 comes with a weatherproof polycarbonate housing that can be mounted on trees, rocks, or other substrates for recording in the field. Recordings can be saved on a microSD card for download using card reader or using the mobile application.

=== Obsolete products ===
==== Song Meter SM2 digital field recorder ====
The company has sold autonomous and weatherproof battery operated recorders called Song Meters for monitoring birds, frogs and other wildlife since 2007. The device can record for up to 230 hours spread out over months and can be programmed to record at specific times of day. In addition to the standard omnidirectional microphone, the company also sells a directional microphone for recording night flight calls of migrating birds as well a hydrophone that can be attached for monitoring underwater.

==== Song Meter SM2BAT long-term passive bat recorder ====
In April 2009, Wildlife Acoustics released an ultrasonic capable version of the SM2BAT. The bat detector records in full spectrum at 192 kHz sample rate and the files can be converted to zero-cross files in post processing. The SM2BAT can record two channels simultaneously allowing a second microphone to be mounted up to 100m away from the recorder. With 4 SDHC cards the device can record about 240 nights of bat calls. In August 2009 a one channel 384 kHz sample rate version was added to allow recording of higher frequency bats common in some areas of Europe.

==== Song Meter SM2M submersible long-term passive recorder ====
Adding the ability to record underwater to their SM2 range, Wildlife Acoustics released the SM2M underwater passive acoustic monitor in May 2011. The unit has a depth rating of 150m and is designed for long-term autonomous recording. Recording life of up to 1500 hours is possible using 32 standard alkaline D cell batteries. The recorder can record sounds from 2 Hz to 48 kHz and stores recordings on up to four SDHC or SDXC cards.

EM3 real-time spectrogram.

==== Echo Meter EM3 handheld active bat detector ====
At the UK National Bat Conference, Wildlife Acoustics announced the Echo Meter handheld bat detector. The device will be available in December 2011. The detector is capable of monitoring for bats using heterodyne, frequency division or Real Time Expansion (RTE). RTE is Wildlife Acoustics proprietary technique for shifting bat sounds to the audible range while maintaining distinctive temporal and spectral characteristics of the call. In addition, the EM3 can record in full spectrum and/or zero-cross to an SD card while monitoring. A real time spectrogram shows calls as they are happening while monitoring and/or recording. The spectrogram can be scrolled back to analyze the spectrogram of previous bat calls. Calls can be played back using time expansion.

==== Song Scope analysis software ====
Song Scope is a software program that allows viewing of calls on a spectrogram and building "recognizers" to automatically search recordings for specific vocalizations.

== Patents ==
Wildlife Acoustics has been awarded the following U.S. Patents:

- U.S. Patent 7,454,334 "Method and apparatus for automatically identifying animal species from their vocalizations"
- U.S. Patent 7,782,195 "Apparatus for low power autonomous data recording"

== See also ==
- Bat detector
- Bat species identification
