= Bat detector =

Audio device to detect the presence of bat sound signals

A bat detector on a table

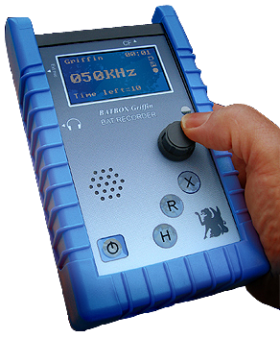
All-digital bat detector with heterodyne, frequency division and time expansion

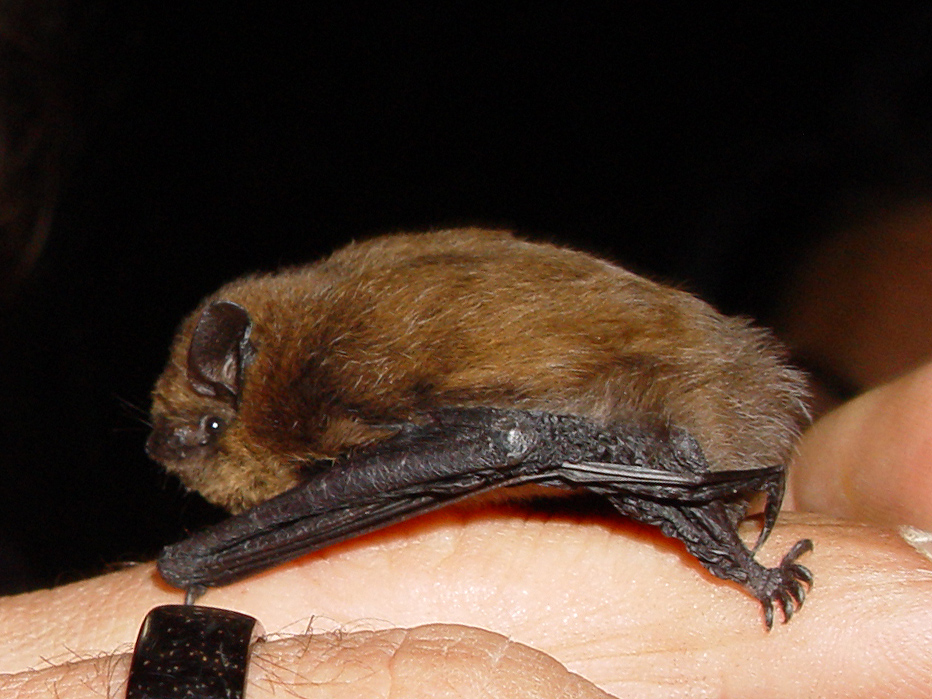
Common Pipistrelle

Common Pipistrelle
Common Pipistrelle call heard on a heterodyne bat detector - 68 KB. This is a typical echolocation call with "feeding buzzes" when it attempts to capture an insect.

A bat detector is a device used to detect the presence of bats by converting their echolocation ultrasound signals, as they are emitted by the bats, to audible frequencies, usually about 120 Hz to 15 kHz. There are other types of detectors which record bat calls so that they can be analysed afterward, but these are more commonly referred to by their particular function.

Bats emit calls from about 12 kHz to 160 kHz, but the upper frequencies in this range are rapidly absorbed in air. Many bat detectors are limited to around 15 kHz to 125 kHz at best. Bat detectors are available commercially and also can be self-built.

== Using bat detectors ==
Bat detectors are used to detect the presence of bats and also help form conclusions about their species. Some bat calls are distinct and easy to recognise such as the horseshoe bats; other calls are less distinct between similar species. While bats can vary their calls as they fly and hunt, the ear can be trained to recognise species according to the frequency ranges and repetition rates of the echolocation calls. Bats also emit social calls (non-echolocation calls) at ultrasound frequencies.

A major limitation of acoustic bat detectors is their range, which is limited by the absorption of ultrasound in air. At mid range frequencies around 50 kHz, the maximum range is only about 25 to 30 metres in average atmospheric conditions when bats fly. This decreases with increasing frequency. Some bat calls have components around 20 kHz or even lower and sometimes these can be detected at 2 or 3 times the usual range. However, only the lower frequency components will be detected at a distance. The usable range of bat detectors decreases with humidity and in misty conditions the maximum range can be very low.

It is important to recognise three types of bat echolocation call: frequency modulation (FM), constant frequency (CF) (sometimes called amplitude modulation), and composite calls with both FM and CF components. The following illustrates a bat making an FM type call followed by a bat which uses a CF type call:

Bat FM call and CF call
Frequency modulated call followed by a constant frequency call as heard on a heterodyne bat detector - 190 Kb

The FM call is heard as rapid dry clicks and the CF call as peeps. These vary in frequency due to the Doppler effect as the bat flies past. A heterodyne bat detector exaggerates the Doppler effect. As the bat making the CF calls flies toward the detector, the pitch falls.

Several species of bat use a composite FM and CF call starting with a rapid falling FM call which slows to become a CF call at the end, giving a "hockey stick" shape to the graph. This makes the call sound different on a bat detector:

Bat hockey stick call
Soprano Pipistrelle call recorded on a heterodyne bat detector set to near the end frequency - 190 Kb

This gives a much wetter sound that the pure FM call. Pipistrelles generally use the hockey stick call for general echolocation, but use only the FM part at times. The end frequencies for the Common Pipistrelle and the Soprano Pipistrelle are around 45 kHz and 55 kHz respectively, but these frequencies can vary widely.

There are three types of "real time" audio bat detector in common use: the heterodyne, frequency division, and time expansion. Some bat detectors combine two or all three types.

Comparison of heterodyne vs. time expansion
At 9.6 seconds, the detector was switched from heterodyne mode (45 kHz) to 20 fold time expansion, replaying the 2.5 seconds previously recorded. Only time expansion reveals the presence of multiple different overlapping types of bat calls. - 770 Kb

== Bat detector types ==
=== Heterodyne ===
Illustration of heterodyne mixing. An incoming down chirp is combined with a constant 50 kHz frequency signal (LO, Fig. A). Fig. B shows the resulting signal with low (difference) and high (sum) frequency components. Figs. C:/D: depicts the resp. magnitudes in the frequency domain.

Heterodyne detectors are the most commonly used, and most self-build detectors are of this type. A heterodyne function is often also built into the other types of detector. A heterodyne bat detector simply shifts all the ultrasound frequencies downward by a fixed amount so we can hear them.

A "heterodyne" is a beat frequency such as can be heard when two close musical notes are played together. A heterodyne bat detector combines the bat call with a constant internal frequency so that sum and difference frequencies are generated. For instance, a bat call at 45 kHz and an internal frequency of 43 kHz produces output frequencies of 2 kHz and 88 kHz. The 88 kHz frequency is inaudible and is filtered out and the 2 kHz frequency is fed to a loudspeaker or headphones. The internal frequency is displayed on a dial or on a display.

A better quality version of a heterodyne, or direct conversion, bat detector is the super-heterodyne detector. In this case the bat signal is mixed with a high frequency oscillator, typically around 450–600 kHz. The difference frequency is then amplified and filtered in an 'intermediate frequency' or i.f. amplifier before being converted back to audible frequencies again. This design, which is based on standard radio design, gives improved frequency discrimination and avoids problems with interference from the local oscillator.

In more recent DSP-based detectors, the heterodyne conversion can be done entirely digitally.

It is also possible to use a 'comb spectrum' generator as the local oscillator so that the detector is effectively tuned to many frequencies, 10 kHz apart, simultaneously.

Some early bat detectors used ex-Navy low frequency radio sets, simply replacing the aerial with a microphone and pre-amplifier. It is also possible to modify a portable Long Wave radio to be a bat detector by adjusting the tuning frequencies and replacing the ferrite rod aerial with a microphone and pre-amplifier.

==== How it is used ====
The operator guesses the likely species to be present and tunes the frequency accordingly. Many users will start listening around 45 kHz. If a bat is seen or a bat-like call is heard, the frequency is tuned up and down until the clearest sound is heard.

Species like Pipistrelles which end their call with a "hockey stick" CF component can be recognised according to the lowest frequency which gives the clearest "plop" sound. Horseshoe bats give a peeping sound at a frequency depending on their species. FM calls all tend to sound like clicks, but the start and end frequencies and the call repetition pattern can give clues as to the species.

==== Pros and cons ====
The advantages of a heterodyne bat detector is that it works in real time, exaggerates the frequency changes of a bat call, is easy to use, and is the least expensive. It is easy to recognise a doppler shift in CF calls of flying bats due to their speed of flight. Stereo listening and recording is possible with models such as the CSE stereo heterodyne detector, and this can help to track bats when visibility is poor.

The disadvantages of a heterodyne bat detector are that it can only convert a narrow band of frequencies, typically 5 kHz, and has to be continually retuned, and can easily miss species out of its current tuned range.

=== Frequency division ===
Frequency division: Original signal is converted into square waves and then divided by a fixed factor (here: 16).

Frequency division (FD) bat detectors synthesise a sound which is a fraction of the bat call frequencies, typically 1/10. This is done by converting the call into a square wave, otherwise called a zero crossing signal. This square wave is then divided using an electronic counter by 10 to provide another square wave. Square waves sound harsh and contain harmonics which can cause problems in analysis so these are filtered out where possible. Some recent all-digital detectors can synthesise a sine wave instead of a square wave. One example of a detector which synthesises a sine-wave FD output is the Griffin.

Some FD detectors output this constant level signal which renders background noise and bat calls at the same high level. This causes problems with both listening and analysis. More sophisticated FD detectors such as the Batbox Duet measure the incoming volume level, limiting the noise threshold, and use this to restore the output level variations. This and other sophisticated FD detectors also include a heterodyne detector and provide a jack output so that independent outputs can be recorded for later analysis.

==== How it is used ====
With dual output FD detectors, headphones can be used to monitor both outputs simultaneously, or the loudspeaker used with the heterodyne function and the FD output recorded and analysed later. Alternatively, listening to the FD output gives an audible rendering of the bat call at 1/10 frequency. An example of a dual detector is the Ciel CDB301.

Dual FD/heterodyne detectors are useful for cross country transects especially when there is a function provided for recording voice notes such as times, locations and recognised bat calls. The output or outputs are recorded on cassette tape, Minidisc or solid state recorders, downloaded to a computer, and analysed using custom software. Calls missed by the heterodyne function, if present, can be seen and measured on the analysis.

==== Pros and cons ====
Advantages, As with a heterodyne detector, an FD detector works in real time with or without a heterodyne function. Bat calls can be heard in their entirety over their whole range rather than over a limited frequency range. Retuning with an FD detector is not required although this is done with a dual type with heterodyne. By analysing the recording later, the entire call frequency range and the call pattern can be measured.

A serious disadvantage with real time listening is that the speed of a bat call remains fast, often too fast for the species to be recognised. The frequency changes of CF calls are not exaggerated as with a heterodyne detector and so are less noticeable. Also with some species such as the lesser horseshoe bat with a call around 110 kHz, the resulting frequency is still quite high although it can be recorded. The synthesising of the call means that only one bat call can be reproduced at a time and a muddle is caused by simultaneous calls. Surprisingly, this is not a great disadvantage when analysing a recording later.

=== Time expansion ===
20fold time expansion. Signal amplitude and shape are retained while the expanded signal gets lowered 20fold in frequency content and its duration expanded respectively.

Time expansion (TE) detectors work by digitising the bat calls at a high sampling rate using an analog-to-digital converter and storing the digitised signal in an on-board memory.

TE detectors are "real time" devices in that they can be monitored at the time of recording, but there is an inevitable delay while the high speed sampled extract is slowed down and replayed.

==== How it is used ====
In real time mode, with or without an associated heterodyne or FD detector, the slowed down calls can be heard as a drawn-out bat call at audible frequencies. Therefore, fast FM calls can be heard as a descending note instead of a click. Thus it is possible to hear the difference between FM calls which just sound like clicks on the other types of detector.

After downloading an audio recording to a computer, the original calls are analysed as if they were still at the original non-expanded rate.

==== Pros and cons ====
The output can be recorded with an audio recorder as with FD detectors, or with more recent units, the signal can be recorded directly to an internal digital memory such as a compact flash card. The whole waveform is recorded with the full call range being preserved, rather than 1/10 of the waveform as in a FD detector. Since both frequency and amplitude information are preserved in the recorded call, more data is available for species analysis.

Early units were equipped with small memories which limited the length of time that could be digitised. Once the memory was filled (usually only a few seconds maximum), the unit would then replay the recording at slower rate, typically between 1/10 to 1/32 of the rate of the original recording. While the recorded sample is being played back slowly, nothing is being recorded, so the bat calls are being sampled intermittently. For instance, when a 1-second call is being played back at 1/32 rate, 32 seconds of bat calls are not being recorded.

More recent time-expansion recorders use large flash-based memories (such as removable compact-flash cards) and high-bandwidth direct-to-card recording to provide continuous, full-bandwidth real-time recording. Such units can record continuously for many hours while maintaining the maximum information within the signal.

Some units are also equipped with an auto-record function and these can be left in-the-field for many days.

Some units also include a pre-buffer feature to capture events that happened shortly before the 'record' button was pressed which can be useful for manual surveys.

TE detectors are typically used for professional and research work, as they allow a complete analysis of the bats' calls at a later time.

== Sampling frequency for digital/TE detectors ==
Research in 2010 observed that frequencies used by bats can be has high as 250 kHz.). The Nyquist–Shannon sampling theorem observes that the minimum sampling frequency required to record a signal successfully must be greater than twice the bandwidth of the signal. To record a bandwidth of 250 kHz therefore requires a sampling frequency in excess of 500 kHz. Modern Time-Expansion capable units typically sample at between 300 kHz and 700 kHz. In general, faster is better, though a higher sampling frequency does use more storage space.

== Other bat detector types ==
=== Zero crossing analysis ===
ZCA is most commonly associated with the Anabat bat detector from Titley Scientific. The original bat calls are digitised and the zero crossing points used to produce a data stream which is recorded on a memory card. There are sophisticated timing and trigger controls and the device can be set to respond to bat calls, enabling autonomous collections of bat calls. ZCA reduces the amount of data which must be recorded to the memory and may be considered as a simple form of lossy data compression. Historically, to achieve long recording times, such information reduction has been necessary due to memory capacity limitations and memory cost.

The solid state ZCA recording is analysed by custom software to produce a time/frequency plot of each call which can be examined for species recognition in a similar way to FD or TE recordings.

==== Pros and cons ====
While the ZCA detector can also be used in real time, its value is for remote recording over long periods. The analysis is similar to that for FD recordings, but there is no amplitude data included. However it does accurately record each zero crossing point, rather than only one in ten. As with all recording devices triggered by an input, a ZCA detector recording automatically is prone to ultrasonic interference from insects such as crickets. Filters can be written to select a characteristic frequency of certain species and ignore others; some (CF species) are more easily filtered.

=== High frequency recording ===
This can be done by using a high speed digitiser peripheral on a computer such as a laptop. These recordings of bat calls can be analysed similarly to TE recordings. This method produces large data files and produces no means of detecting bat calls without the simultaneous use of a bat detector. A conventional bat detector can be replaced by more advanced systems which can provide a real-time spectrographic display, automated call parameter measurement and classification tools, integrated GPS functionality and a metadata input tool for documenting the recordings.

=== DSP detectors ===
DSP bat detectors aim to provide an acoustically accurate portrayal of bat calls by using a digital signal processor to map bats' ultrasounds signals to audible sounds; different algorithms are being used to accomplish this, and there is active development and tuning of algorithms going on.

One strategy called "frequency shifting" uses a FFT signal analysis in order to find the main frequency and signal power, then using digital simulation a new audible wave is synthesized from the original one divided by a defined value.

The processes of Frequency Division and Heterodyne conversion can also be performed digitally.

=== Time domain signal coding ===
This type of bat detector is believed to be in pre-production or experimental and is not available commercially. Research is in progress for analysing many types of ultrasound calls and sounds besides those of bats.

A TDSC detector digitises the original calls and derives a two dimensional data string by analysing the parameters of each call with respect to time. This is analysed by a neural network to provide pattern recognition for each species.

== Non-acoustic detection ==
Visual observation is the obvious means of detecting bats, but of course this can only be done in daylight or crepuscular conditions (i.e., dusk and dawn). Emergence counts are done visually at dusk, using a bat detector for confirmation of species. In lower light conditions a night vision device can be used but the more affordable generation 1 type has a lag time which fails to provide a suitable image of a flying bat.

Infrared (IR) cameras and camcorders are used with an IR illuminator to observe bat emergences and bat behaviour inside and outside roosts. The problem with this method is that deriving a count from a recording is tedious and time consuming, but camcorders can be useful as a backup in roost emergence counts to observe bats re-entering the roost. Many Sony camcorders are sensitive to infrared.

Infrared beam devices usually consist of a dual array of invisible IR beams. The size of the roost entrance determines the number of beams necessary and thus the power required and potential for off-mains use. Single beam DIY systems are available for bat boxes but these do not log the direction of transit. Almost all the systems in use today are non-commercial or DIY. A system in use in some mines in Wisconsin uses two arrays of beams however they are spaced quite far apart and consequently only log approximately 50% of the bats although extrapolated figures are achieved through correlation of time stamped video and beam break data. The Countryside Council for Wales (CCW) uses two similar systems with beams spaced close enough together that every bat transiting the entrance is logged along with the temperature. These systems require either mains power or 12 V deep cycle batteries. They can be used in conjunction with an Anabat Zcaim installed in a 6" soil pipe and pointed across the roost entrance to discriminate between species by correlating the time stamp data from the IR array and filtered Anabat Zcaim data for horseshoe bats (relatively easy due to their easily identifiable CF echolocation which can be filtered automatically using Anabat software).

Data from beam break systems must be carefully analysed to eliminate "light sampling behaviour" (environment sampling) where the bats repeatedly leave the roost and return immediately if the conditions are not suitable. Some systems discriminate for bat-sized animals; they determine if the beams are broken by a bat sized animal and ignore all other transits. It is important that data is analysed using a methodology which takes light sampling behaviour into account. The method which seems to give the most accurate results is as follows: "out" transit assigned 1, "in" transit assigned -1. Start count is set to zero at 4 p.m. daily. Using a spreadsheet, the counts are added cumulatively from 4 p.m. each day until 9 a.m. the next day. The maximum "positive" count can easily be found for each day. Since every transit is time stamped, the exact time of the maximum daily count is also known. Light sampling counts are eliminated from the data since an "out" 1 is cancelled by an "in" -1, resulting in a cumulative count of zero for light sampling bats.

Thermal imagers which are of a high enough definition to register bats at over 30 metres range are expensive, but have been used to assess the dangers of wind turbines to birds and bats. "Affordable" thermal imagers have a bat detecting range about the same order of acoustic bat detectors due to the small size and the low heat emissions of bats.

Passive infrared sensors are slow with a response speed of the order of a tenth of a second and will normally not detect a small fast mammal like a bat.

Radar has been used to detect bats beyond the acoustic limit, but is very costly in equipment and man hours. Bird Aircraft Strike Hazard (BASH) installations are capable of detecting bats, but are usually situated where few bats fly. There are very few suitable mobile terrestrial radars available anywhere. Hand-held doppler radar modules have been used in the field to allow researchers to compensate for the doppler shift imposed on recordings of bat signals due to their flight speed. This allows the researchers to tell whether the bats are changing the pitch of their calls in flight.

== See also ==
- Bat species identification
