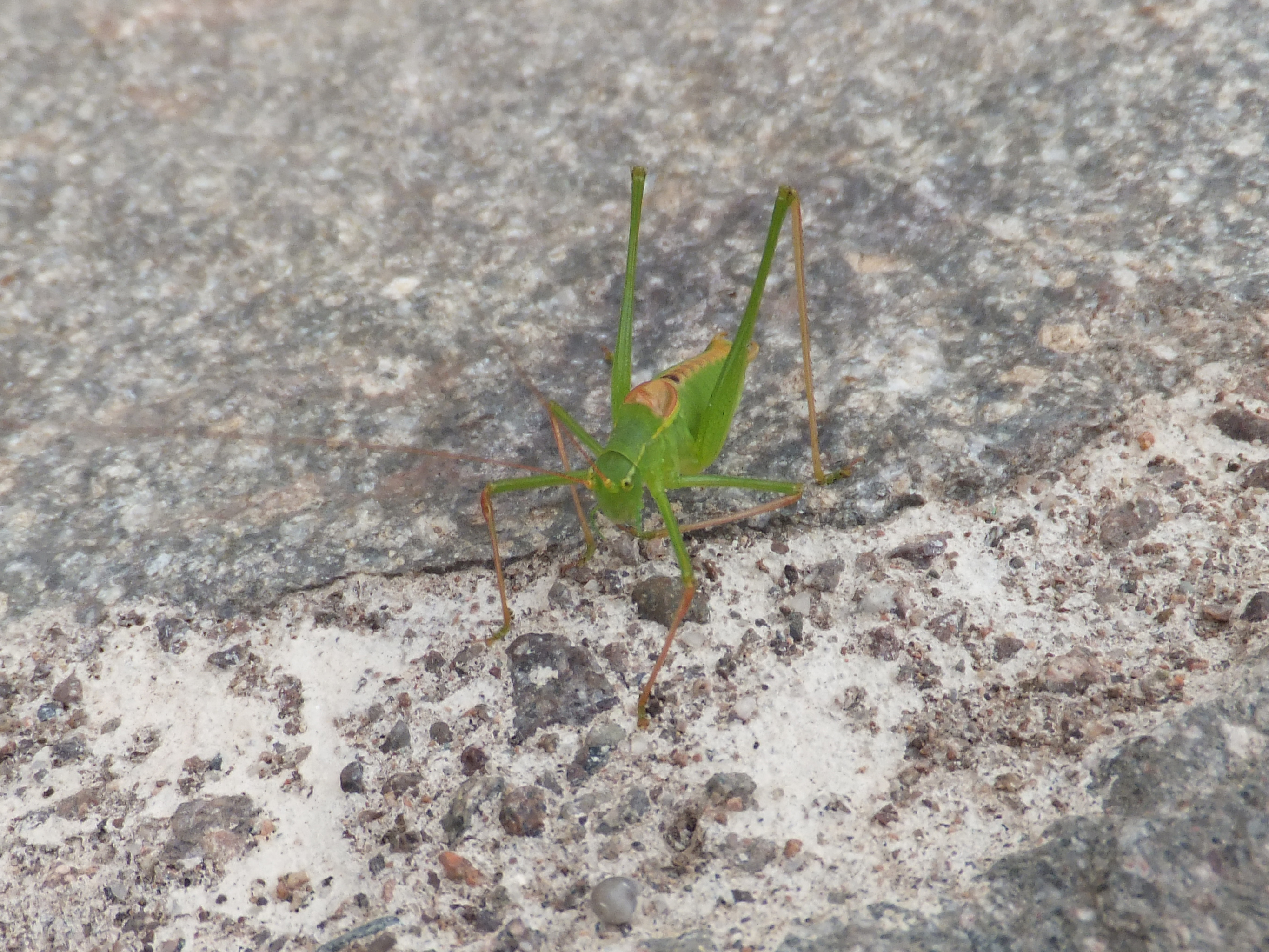
- Male

Scientific classification
- Kingdom: Animalia
- Phylum: Arthropoda
- Class: Insecta
- Order: Orthoptera
- Suborder: Ensifera
- Family: Tettigoniidae
- Subfamily: Phaneropterinae
- Genus: Leptophyes
- Species: L. laticauda

Binomial name
- Leptophyes laticauda (Frivaldszky, 1867)

Synonyms
- Barbitistes ruficosta Frey-Gessner, 1872; Odontura laticauda Frivaldsky, 1867

= Leptophyes laticauda =

Species of cricket-like animal

Close-Up of a Leptophyes laticauda

Leptophyes laticauda is a species of bush-crickets belonging to the family Tettigoniidae.

== Distribution and habitat ==
This species occurs from Provence across the Southern Alps to the Balkans and it is present in France, Italy, Switzerland and Croatia. These bush-crickets can be found on shaded and damp forest edges.

== Description ==
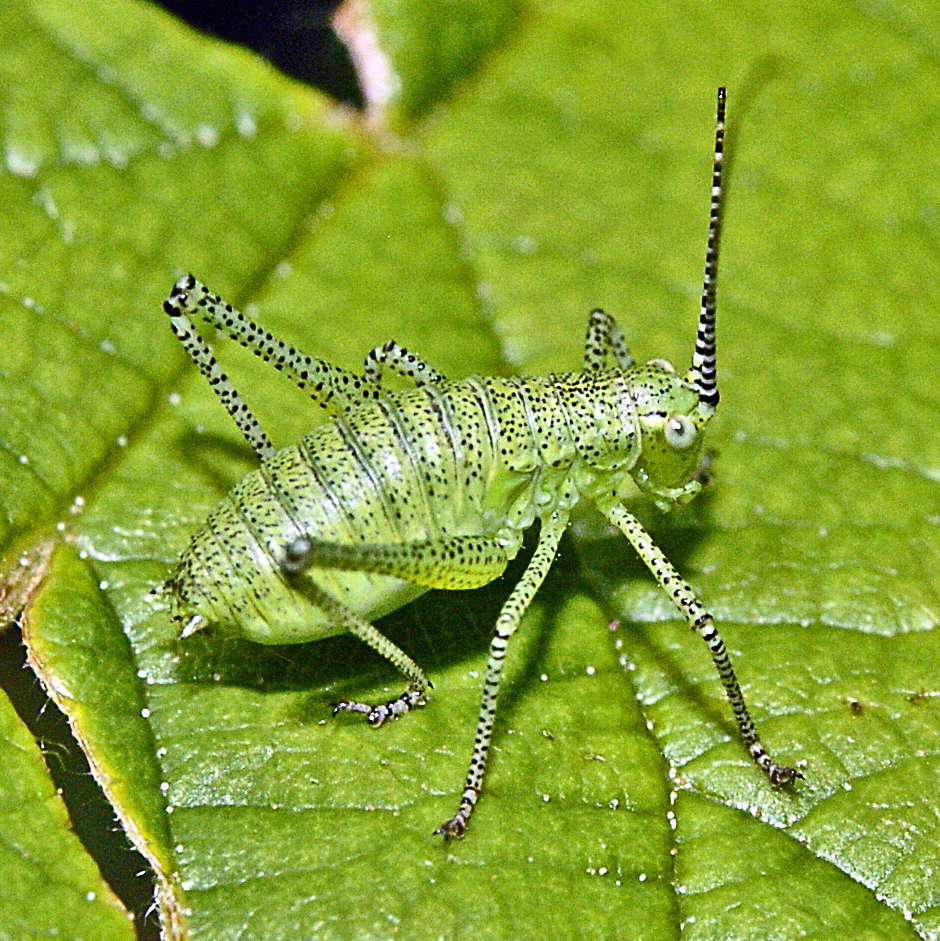
Leptophyes laticauda, nymph

Leptophyes laticauda can reach a length of 16–20 millimetres (0.63–0.79 in) in males, of 16–22 millimetres (0.63–0.87 in) in females, with an ovipositor of 10–13 millimetres (0.39–0.51 in). It is the largest species of the genus Leptophyes. The basic body color of this species is light green punctuated by numerous small black spots, with a wide reddish brown longitudinal stripe along the back. Antennae, lower legs, feet, wings and cerci are yellow to reddish-brown. The wings are greatly shortened. In males cerci are stout and angularly bent, with a blunt tip.

== Biology ==
Leptophyes laticauda mainly feed on leaves of many deciduous woods, on blackberry and on nettle. Adults appear from July to October.

== Bibliography ==
- Heiko Bellmann: Der Kosmos Heuschreckenführer. Die Arten Mitteleuropas sicher bestimmen. Franckh-Kosmos Verlags GmbH & Co. KG, Stuttgart 2006, ISBN 3440104478
- Chopard (1951) Orthoptéroïdes, Faune de France, Fédération Française des Sociétés de Sciences Naturelles, Paris 56:359 pp., 531 figs
- Defaut [Ed.] (2001), La détermination des Orthoptères de France, Defaut, Bedeilhac 85
- Fontana, Buzzetti, Cogo & Odé (2002), Guida al riconoscimento e allo studio di cavallette, grilli, mantidi e insetti affini del Veneto: Blattaria, Mantodea, Isoptera, Orthoptera, Phasmatodea, Dermaptera, Embidiina, Museo Naturalistico Archaeologico di Vicenza, Vicenza 1-592
- Griffini (1893) Ortotteri del Piemonte. I. Locustidi, Bollettino dei Musei di Zoologia ed Anatomia Comparata della R. Università di Torino (Boll. Musei Zool. Anat. Comp. R. Univ. Torino) 8(141):1-29
