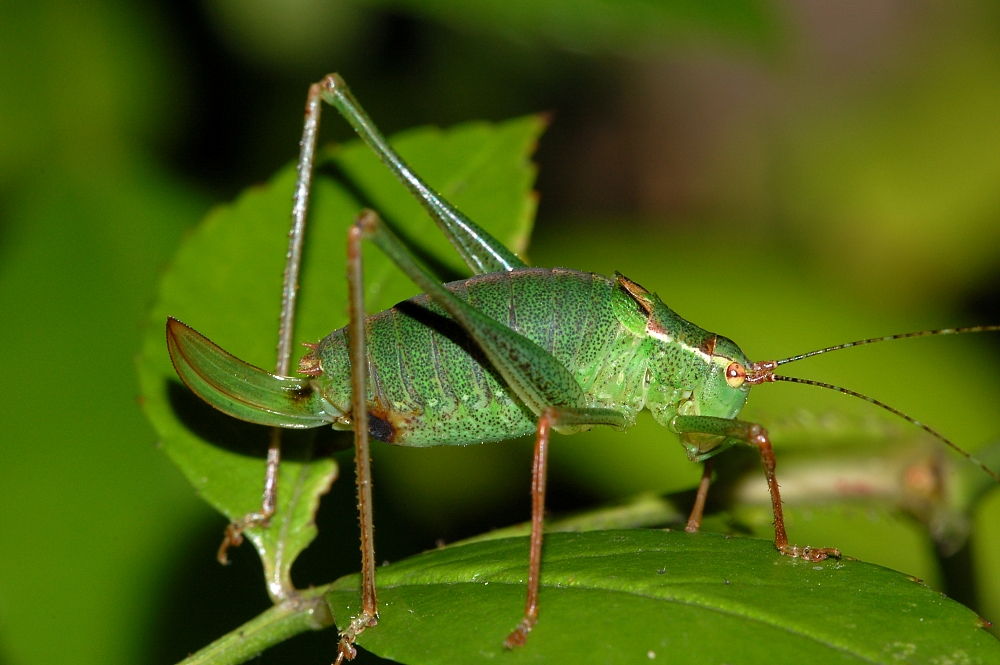
- Leptophyes punctatissima

Scientific classification
- Kingdom: Animalia
- Phylum: Arthropoda
- Class: Insecta
- Order: Orthoptera
- Suborder: Ensifera
- Family: Tettigoniidae
- Subfamily: Phaneropterinae
- Tribe: Barbitistini
- Genus: Leptophyes; Fieber, 1853

= Leptophyes =

Genus of cricket-like animals

Leptophyes is a genus of bush-crickets (family Tettigoniidae) found in Africa, Asia, and Europe. The genus was erected by Franz Xaver Fieber in 1853.

== Description ==
In these bush-crickets the antennae are up to four times as long as the body. The legs are quite long. The tibiae are twice as long as the pronotum.

== Distribution ==
Species within this genus are present in Europe, Asia Minor, Palestine, Ethiopia and Kashmir.

== Species ==
Species within this genus include:

- Leptophyes albovittata (Kollar, 1833)
- Leptophyes angusticauda Brunner von Wattenwyl, 1891
- Leptophyes bolivari Kirby, 1906
- Leptophyes boscii Fieber, 1853
- Leptophyes calabra Kleukers, Odé & Fontana, 2010
- Leptophyes discoidalis (Frivaldsky, 1867)
- Leptophyes festae Giglio-Tos, 1893
- Leptophyes helleri Sevgili, 2004
- Leptophyes intermedia Ingrisch & Pavicevic, 2010
- Leptophyes iranica (Ramme, 1939)
- Leptophyes karanae Naskrecki & Ünal, 1995
- Leptophyes laticauda (Frivaldsky, 1867)
- Leptophyes lisae Heller, 1988
- Leptophyes nigrovittata Uvarov, 1921
- Leptophyes peneri Harz, 1970
- Leptophyes punctatissima (Bosc, 1792)
- Leptophyes purpureopunctatus Garai, 2002
- Leptophyes sicula Kleukers, Odé & Fontana, 2010
- Leptophyes trivittata Bei-Bienko, 1950
