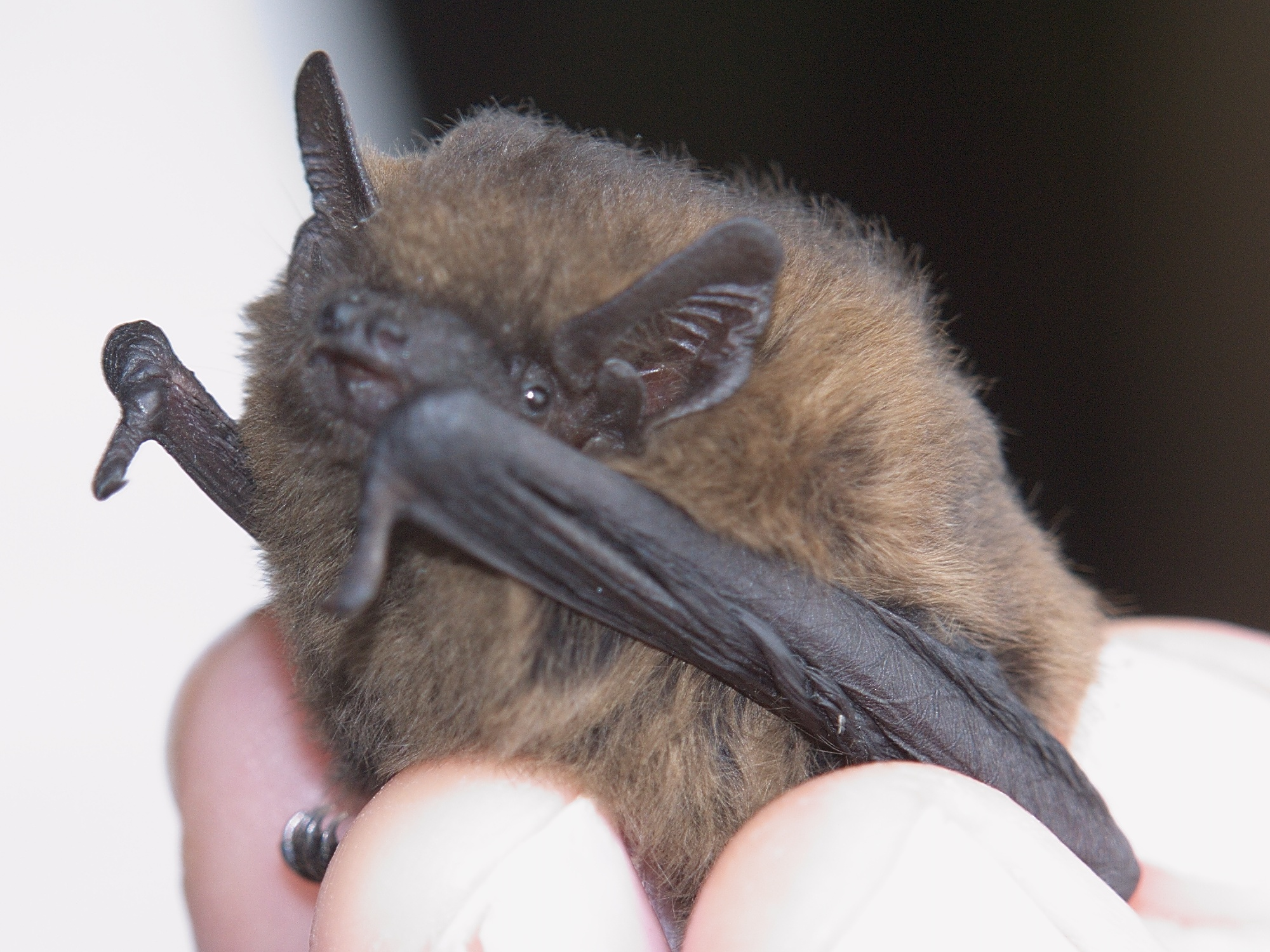

Conservation status
- Least Concern (IUCN 3.1)

Scientific classification
- Kingdom: Animalia
- Phylum: Chordata
- Class: Mammalia
- Order: Chiroptera
- Family: Vespertilionidae
- Genus: Pipistrellus
- Species: P. pipistrellus

Binomial name
- Pipistrellus pipistrellus (Schreber, 1774)

Synonyms
- Vespertilio pipistrellus Schreber, 1774; Vesperugo pipistrellus Keyserling & Blasius, 1839

= Common pipistrelle =

Species of mammal

The common pipistrelle (Pipistrellus pipistrellus) is a small pipistrelle microbat whose very large range extends across most of Europe, North Africa, and central South Asia, and may extend into Korea. It is one of the most common bat species in the British Isles. In Europe, the northernmost confirmed records are from southern Finland near 60°N.

In 1999, the common pipistrelle was split into two species on the basis of different-frequency echolocation calls. The common pipistrelle uses a call of 45 kHz, while the soprano pipistrelle echolocates at 55 kHz. Since the two species were distinguished, a number of other differences in appearance, habitat, and food also have been discovered.

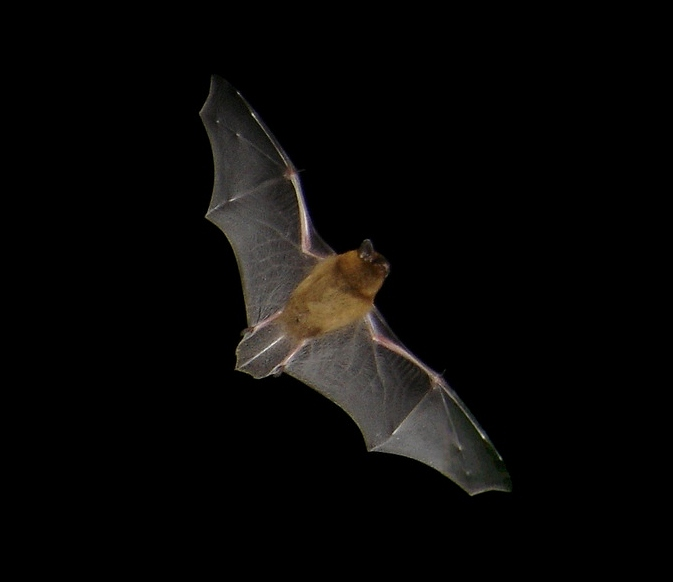
Pipistrellus pipistrellus in flight

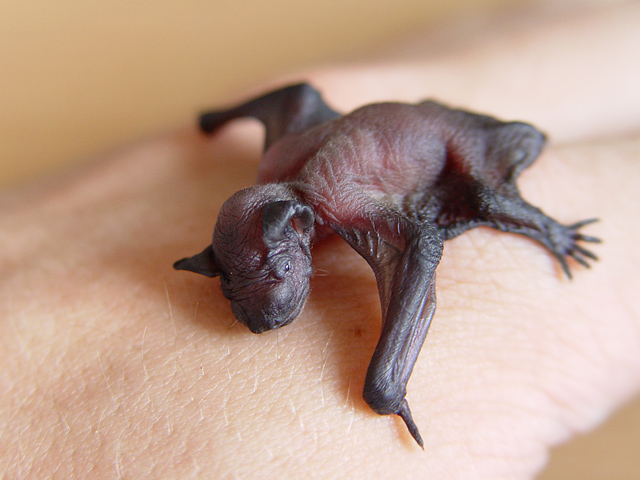
Pipistrellus pipistrellus pup

== Taxonomy and etymology ==
It was described as a new species in 1774 by German naturalist Johann Christian Daniel von Schreber, who initially placed it in the genus Vespertilio, calling it Vespertilio pipistrellus. In 1839, Keyserling and Blasius reclassified the species, naming it Vesperugo pipistrellus. This classification stood until 1897, when Miller placed the species into the genus Pipistrellus, where it remains as Pipistrellus pipistrellus. Its species name "pipistrellus" is derived from the Italian word pipistrello, which means "bat".

The soprano pipistrelle, P. pygmaeus, was formerly considered synonymous with the common pipistrelle. In 1999, it was formally split from the common pipistrelle based on differing echolocation signatures and a genetic divergence of 11%. Despite being different species, the common pipistrelle and the soprano pipistrelle are able to hybridize, based on genetic analysis conducted in Poland.

== Description ==
The common pipistrelle is a very small species of bat. Its forearm is 27.7–32.2 mm (1.09–1.27 in) long. It has a short muzzle. It is 3.5–5.2 cm (1.4–2.0 in) long along the head-and-body, with the tail adding 2.3–3.6 cm (0.91–1.42 in). The body mass can range from 3.5 to 8.5 g (0.12 to 0.30 oz), with the wingspan ranging from 18 to 25 cm (7.1 to 9.8 in). Its brown fur is variable in tone. It is common in woodland and farmland, but is also found in suburban areas, where the females roost in lofts and buildings when rearing young.

== Biology and ecology ==
=== Reproduction ===
Males attract females by creating courtship territories about 200 m (660 ft) in diameter; these territories are maintained from mid-July through the end of October, with particularly intense activity in September. Courtship territories are usually in the vicinity of popular winter roosts for the species. Males patrol these territories while "singing" to attract the attention of female bats as they travel to winter roosts. Male courtship territories are densely packed, offering female choice akin to a lek mating system. While copulation occurs in the fall, fertilization does not occur until after its hibernation due to female sperm storage. Females are pregnant in May and June. Pregnant females form large aggregations in roosts, called maternity colonies. Colonies can consist of dozens or hundreds of individuals. Parturition usually occurs in June. The litter size is usually one young, called a pup, though in some populations, twins are regularly produced. Females nurse their pups through July until weaned by August. Females reach sexual maturity at one year of age.

=== Foraging and diet ===
The common pipistrelle is an edge specialist, preferring to forage along woodland edges and isolated tree lines. It is insectivorous, preying on flies, caddisflies, lacewings, mayflies, and moths. Mosquitoes, midges, and gnats are particularly favored prey items.

A colony of common pipistrelle bats is allowed to hunt within the Biblioteca Joanina at the University of Coimbra in Portugal to protect manuscripts from insects that may eat the paper.

=== Echolocation ===
The frequencies used by this bat species for echolocation lie between 45 and 76 kHz, have most energy at 47 kHz, and have an average duration of 5.6 ms.

== Range and habitat ==
It has a Palearctic distribution, occurring in the British Isles, southern Scandinavia, much of Continental Europe, and parts of Northwest Africa. It is also found in India, China, and Myanmar in Asia.

== Conservation ==
It has been called the most common and abundant species of bat in Continental Europe and the United Kingdom. Notably, however, these judgments were made before it was split into two species in 1999. The common pipistrelle is considered least concern by the IUCN. It meets the criteria for this classification because it has a large geographic range and a presumed large population.

As of 2008, the IUCN noted no evidence of a rapid population decline. However, it is a species of conservation concern in the United Kingdom, where the government created a species action plan to restore its population to pre-1979 levels. Its decline in the UK has been attributed to loss of foraging habitat due to agriculture intensification.

Adhesive traps, commonly used for insect control reasons in Mediterranean olive groves can pose a threat for the common pipistrelle. The bat can become trapped in the adhesive surface while investigating insects accumulated in the trap.
