= List of fauna of Oklahoma =

This is a list of species of fauna that have been observed in the U.S. state of Oklahoma.

== Invertebrates ==
=== Crustaceans ===
==== Decapoda ====
- Delaware County cave crayfish, Cambarus subterraneus
- Swamp dwarf crayfish, Cambarellus puer

=== Insects ===
Hymenoptera

- Eastern carpenter bee, Xylocopa virginica
- Morrison's bumble bee, Bombus morrisoni
- American bumble bee, Bombus pensylvanicus
- Black-and-gold bumble bee, Bombus auricomus
- White-shouldered bumble bee, Bombus appositus
- Variable cuckoo bumble bee, Bombus variabilis
- Indiscriminate bumble bee, Bombus insularis
- Southern plains bumble bee, Bombus fraternus
- Brown-belted bumble bee, Bombus griseocollis
- Common eastern bumble bee, Bombus impatiens
- Two-spotted bumble bee, Bombus bimaculatus
- Half-black bumble bee, Bombus vagans

==== Lepidoptera ====
- List of butterflies of Oklahoma

==== Odonata ====
- Familiar bluet, Enallagma civile
- Citrine forktail, Ischnura hastata

== Vertebrates ==
=== Amphibians ===
- Three-toed amphiuma, Amphiuma tridactylum
- Green toad, Anaxyrus debilis
- Oklahoma salamander, Eurycea tynerensis
- Lesser siren, Siren intermedia
- Plains spadefoot toad, Spea bombifrons

=== Reptiles ===
- Common alligator, Alligator mississippiensis

==== Squamata ====
- Common collared lizard, Crotaphytus collaris—the Oklahoma state reptile
- Copperhead, Agkistrodon contortrix
- Texas night snake, Hypsiglena torquata jani
