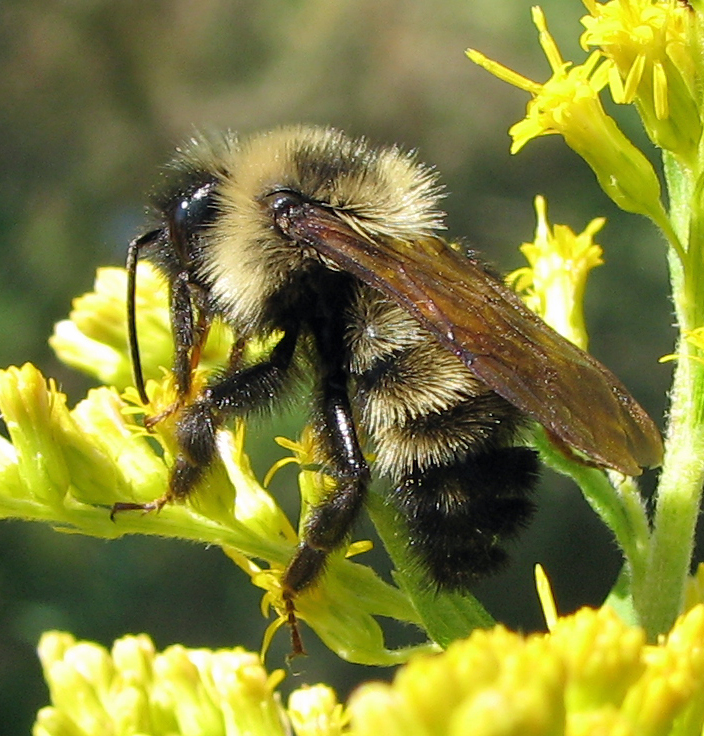

Conservation status
- Least Concern (IUCN 3.1)

Scientific classification
- Kingdom: Animalia
- Phylum: Arthropoda
- Class: Insecta
- Order: Hymenoptera
- Family: Apidae
- Genus: Bombus
- Subgenus: Psithyrus
- Species: B. citrinus

Binomial name
- Bombus citrinus (Smith, 1854)

= Bombus citrinus =

Species of bee

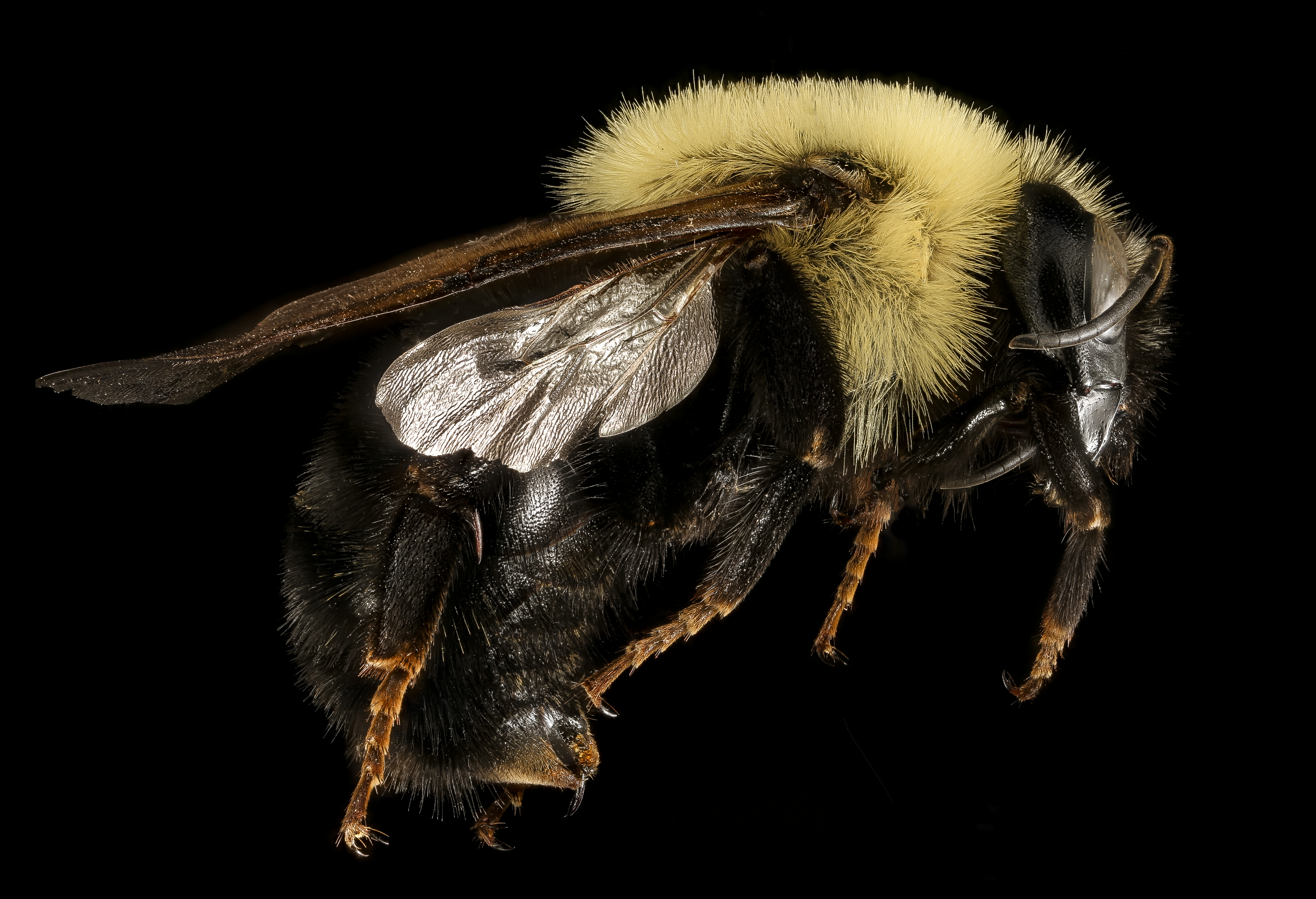
Specimen

Bombus citrinus is a species of bumblebee known commonly as the lemon cuckoo bumblebee due to its lemon-yellow color. It is native to eastern North America.

This is a cuckoo bumblebee, one that invades the colonies of other bumblebees, kills the resident queen, and takes control over the population of workers inside. Host bees for this species include the common eastern bumblebee (Bombus impatiens) and the half-black bumblebee (B. vagans).

Before the queen invades a nest she forages on various plants, such as asters, thistles, snakeroots, blazing-stars, mountain-mints, and goldenrods.

== Phylogeny ==
Bombus citrinus belongs to the parasitic Bombus subgenus Psithyrus. A previous classification had Psithyrus listed as its own genus, and so this species used to be identified as Psithyrus citrinus. Members of Psithyrus are distinguished from other Bombus based on an abdomen with thick tergites, a long stinger, enlarged mandibles, loss of corbiculae, no worker castes, and a reduction in wax glands and its production; all of these features are associated with being inquiline parasites that replace host queens. Of the other species within this subgenera it is most closely related to Bombus insularis and Bombus variabilis and has sometimes been subgrouped with these as Laboriopsithyrus or Citrinopsithyrus. Psithyrus diverged around 20 million years ago from a clade containing the subgenera of Megabombus, Senexibombus, and Diversobombus. Bombus citrinus is believed to have originated from this line around 2 million years ago in the Eastern Nearctic region. While they have developed specializations toward their specific host species, in a coevolutionary relationship, some of their modifications were likely to have remained broad enough to enable these Psithyrus species to diversify and disperse following a small range of hosts in their time and area. Bombus citrinus may have coevolved with its host species as they emerged within the same time frame and area; around 13 to 5 million years ago for Bombus vagans and around 2 million years ago for Bombus impatiens.

== Morphology ==
Like all cuckoo bumble bees, the outer tibial surface of the hind leg is convex and densely hairy, rather than adapted for pollen transport. Their heads are more teardrop shaped and the thorax is predominantly yellow including the lower sides and sometimes down to segment T4 or 5. Hair on the face is usually black with some yellow hairs, there are usually no black hairs on the thorax and would not form a band between the wing bases. Metastomal hairs are short and even and longer on T5 than the other joints and matte with dense punctures on T6. The wings are slightly opaque ranging from a reddish brown to brownish black and yellowish during pubescence. They are sometimes interspersed with black hairs. The male genitalia contain some of the most distinguishing characteristics when differentiating bumble bee species. The gonostylus are lined with long hairs, hairs on the yellow volsella are much shorter. The penis valve is long and thin and relatively straight compared to other bumble bee species.

== Distribution ==
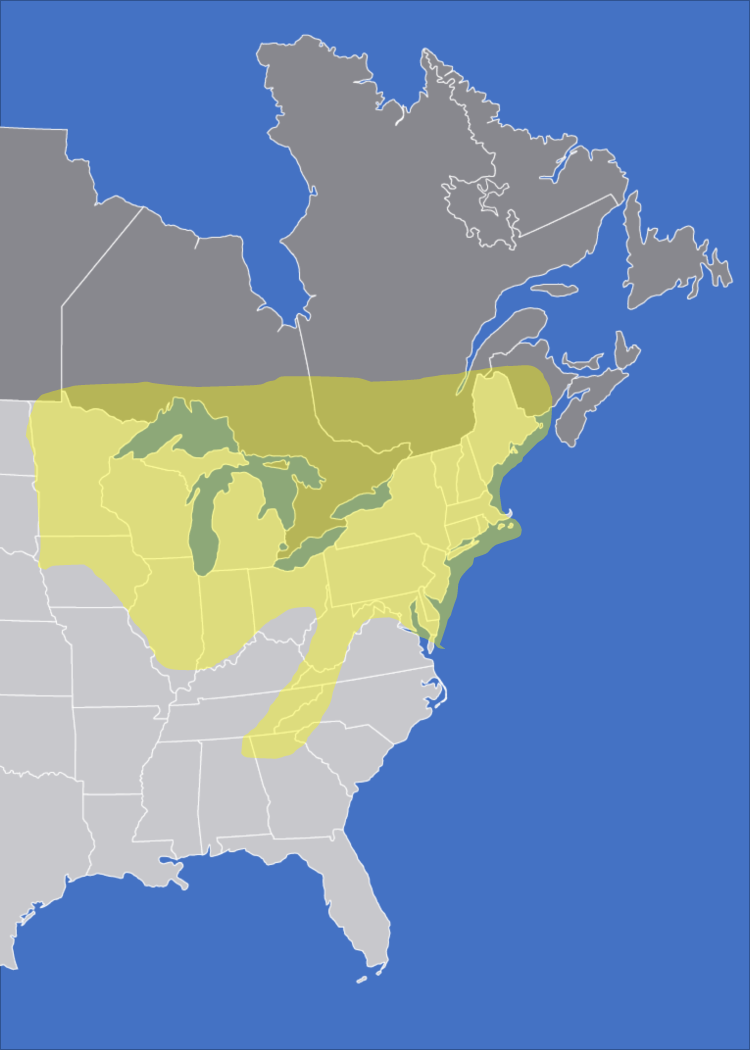
Map showing the distribution of Bombus citrinus

Found in parts of the Northeastern area of North America. Their distribution includes eastern to central parts of Canada, Northeastern U.S states and parts of the mid-western and southeast regions of the U.S.

== Biology ==
=== Chemical ecology ===
When invading a colony, P. citrinus acquire the host scent as well as transfer it using mauling to camouflage and dominate the colony. Colony recognition cues within a colony have an important function in cooperation and distinguishing between nestmates and non-nestmates, parasites, and robbers. Many species in the subgenus Psithyrus use scent to evade the host colony's recognition cues. Long chain alkanes and alkenes may possibly play a role in the production of Psithyrus' scent. The Dufour's gland is enlarged in the Psithyrus subgenus and believed to be the source of chemical production for bees in the genus.

=== Parasitism ===
Bombus citrinus is an obligate social parasite of the species Bombus impatiens and Bombus vagans . The cuckoo bee locates a host nest by trailing chemical signatures left by host workers. After locating a host nest the cuckoo will revisit to further observe the nest and will proceed to infiltrate if she determines the nest to be suitable for a successful usurping. The female Bombus citrinus may be noticed and attacked at nest entrance by host workers or sneak past by having blended in with the hosts chemical signatures. The Bombus citrinus will then kill the host species' queen, eggs, and larvae. To assert its dominance over the host workers the cuckoo will engage in aggressive mauling behavior. Only a few parasitic bees maul and they do so by rubbing their body against the host workers, grabbing at the hosts dorsal and lateral sides with their mandibles and first pair of legs, and making motions as if to sting. By doing this she further shares chemical signatures with the host and suppresses their ovarian development. Eggs laid by the female Bombus citrinus will be laid and then cared for by the host workers.
