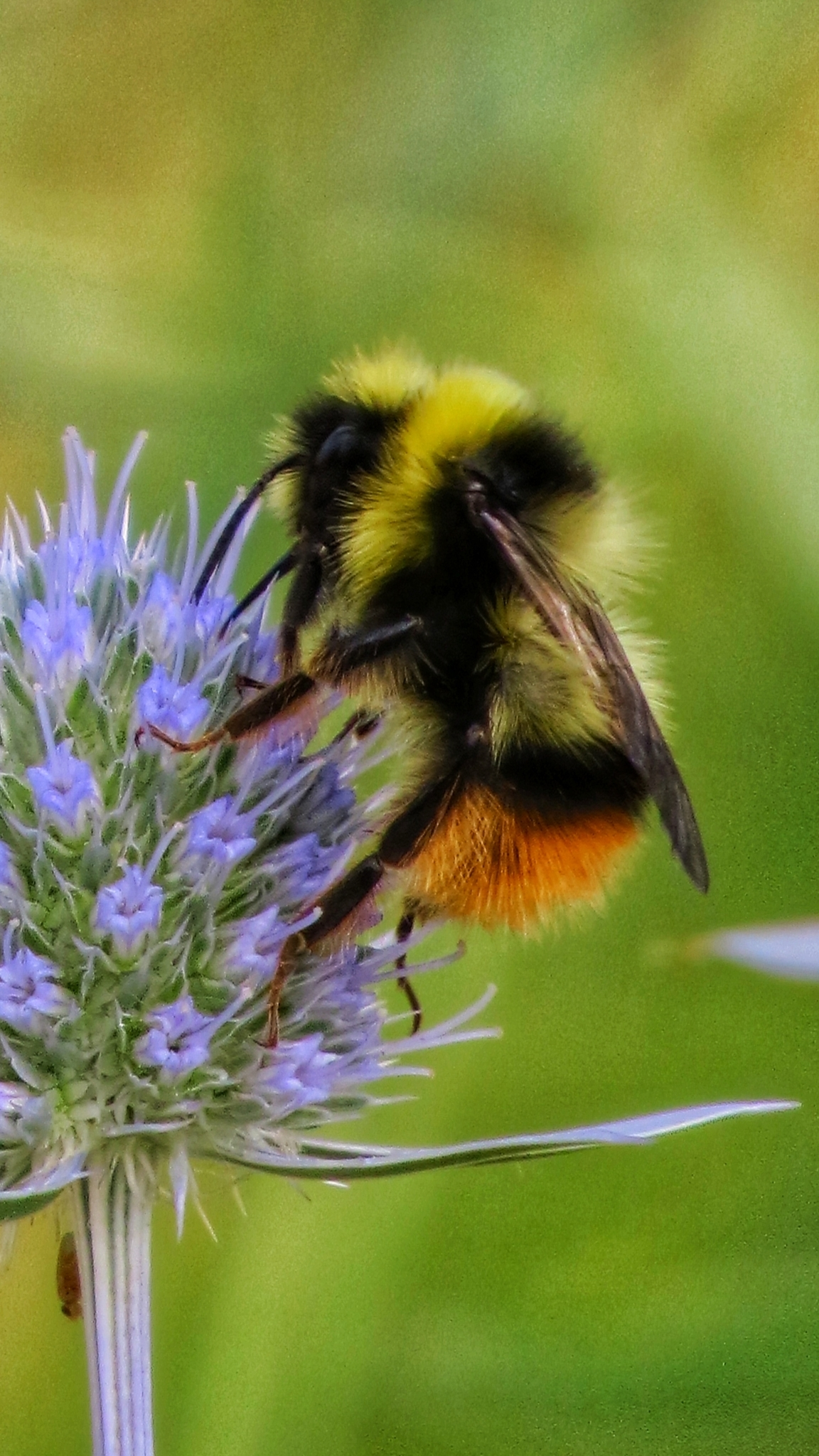
- Novosibirsk Oblast, Russia, 2022

Scientific classification
- Domain: Eukaryota
- Kingdom: Animalia
- Phylum: Arthropoda
- Class: Insecta
- Order: Hymenoptera
- Family: Apidae
- Genus: Bombus
- Species: B. sichelii

Binomial name
- Bombus sichelii Radoszkowski, 1860

= Sichel's bumblebee =

Species of bee

Sichel's bumblebee (Bombus sichelii) is a species of bumblebee.

== Range ==
Bombus sichelii is disjointly distributed in several subspecies in Eurasia: in the Cantabrian Mountains, the Pyrenees, the Alps and the Balkans (no evidence from the Fennoscandian area), in Asia Minor in the eastern Pontic Mountains, in the East Anatolian mountains and in the Caucasus, the Asian population westwards to Arkhangelsk and Moscow, south to Penza and Bashkortostan, east to Kamchatka and Japan. In Central Europe restricted to the Alps. In Germany the species appears only in the Bavarian Alps, in altitudes above 1300 m, mostly between 1900 and 2700 m (Trautmann & Trautmann 1924) and is very rare there. In Austria, with the exception of Burgenland, found in all federal states. In Switzerland historically and currently from the Alpine region, occasionally in the Central Plateau and in the Jura.

== Habitat ==
Mountain slopes with light forests, forest fringes and meadows. From the subalpine to the alpine altitude level.

== Ecology ==
Bombus sichelii is an univoltine species. Overwintered females appear from the end of April to mid-June, depending on the altitude, the young females and males from the beginning of August. The species is polylectic. It nests in underground cavities, e.g. in abandoned mouse nests. Nest-takers and pollen storer. The colonies comprise 80 to 150 individuals.

Parasites: Cuckoo bee is Bombus rupestris.

== Etymology ==
Dedicated to the French entomologist Frédéric Jules Sichel (1802-1868).

== Taxonomy ==
Subgenus Melanabambus DALLA TORRE, 1880.

In Central Europe the ssp. alticala KRIECHBAUMER, 1873 occurs.

Synonyms: Pyrobombus sicheli (RADOSZKOWSKI, 1860); Bombus alticola KRIECHBAUMER, 1873.

Occasionally the species name is spelled with just an "i" - the original spelling is "sichelii" and is the genitive of "Sichelius", the Latinized form of the surname Sichel.
