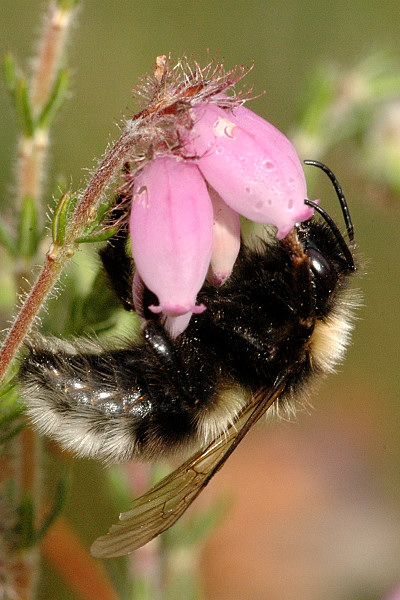

Conservation status
- Least Concern (IUCN 3.1)

Scientific classification
- Domain: Eukaryota
- Kingdom: Animalia
- Phylum: Arthropoda
- Class: Insecta
- Order: Hymenoptera
- Family: Apidae
- Genus: Bombus
- Subgenus: Psithyrus
- Species: B. barbutellus

Binomial name
- Bombus barbutellus (Kirby, 1802)

= Bombus barbutellus =

Species of bee

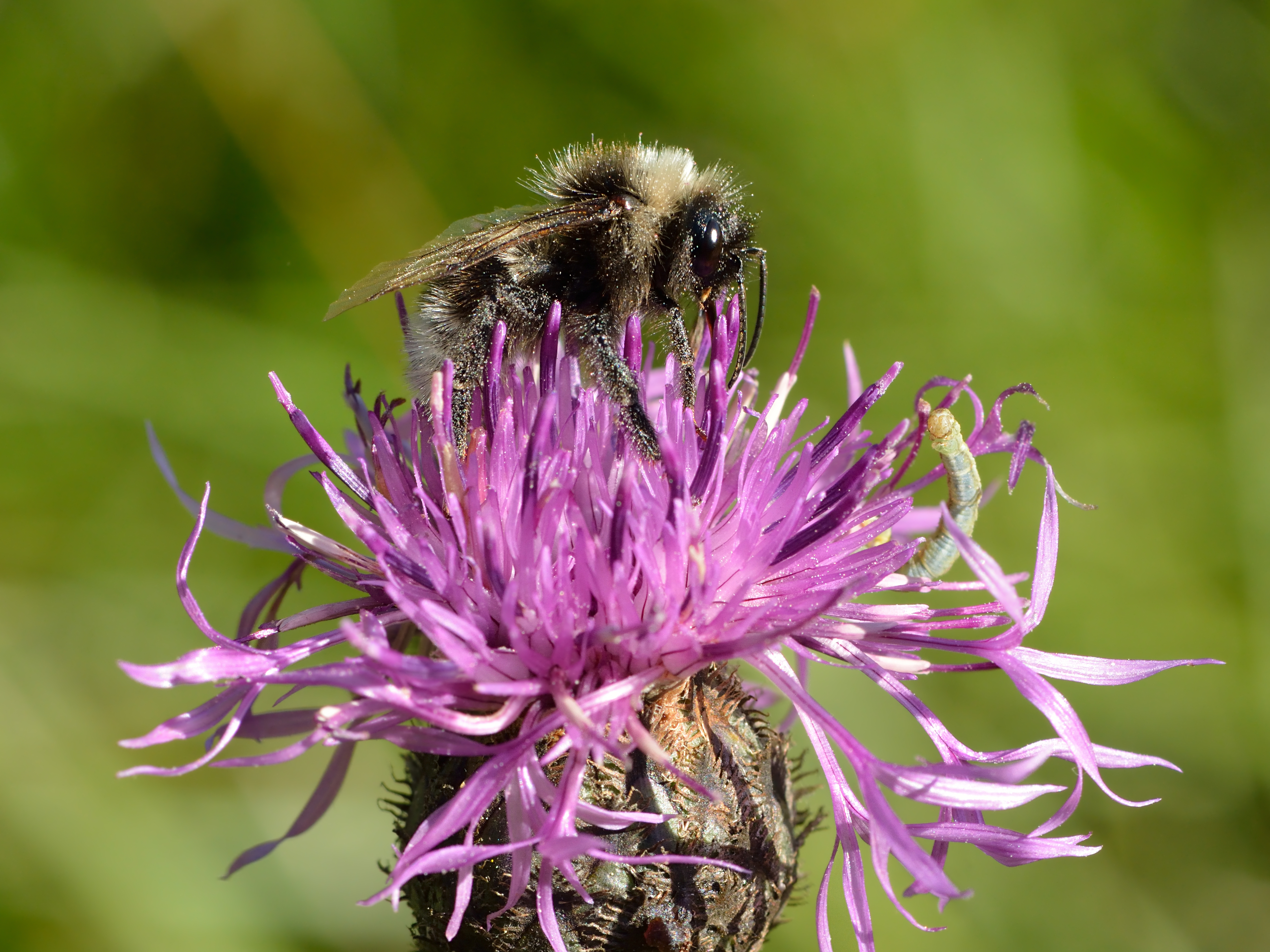

Bombus barbutellus, or Barbut's cuckoo-bee, is a species of cuckoo bumblebee, widespread, if not especially common, in most of Europe.

== Description ==
The species is a medium-length bumblebee with a body length of 18 mm (0.71 in) for the female and 15 mm (0.59 in) for the male. The collar and the top of the head are yellow, the scutellum has yellow hairs (especially visible on the male bumblebee), and the first tergite (abdominal segment) is usually more or less yellow. The tail is whitish; the last tergite of the male, however, has intermixed black hairs. The rest of the fur, which is quite short (especially on old queens after hibernation), is black.

== Ecology ==
As a cuckoo bumblebee, B. barbutellus does not build any nest of its own, but usurps the nests of other bumblebees, killing the queen and forcing the workers to raise its own offspring. The main hosts are B. hortorum, B. ruderatus, and B. argillaceus.

Favourite food sources are flowering plants such as thistles; the queen also visits white deadnettle and vetches, while the male feeds on bramble, knapweed, lavender, and honeysuckles.

== Distribution ==
Bombus barbutellus is widely distributed, if not particularly common, in most of Europe from the middle of Fennoscandia in the north to southern Spain, and from the British Isles in the west to easternmost Russia. In Britain, its major distribution is in southern England, East Anglia, and western Wales.

== See also ==
- Bumblebee
  - List of bumblebee species
    - Southern plains bumblebee, Bombus fraternus
    - New garden bumblebee, Bombus hypnorum
    - Orange-belted bumblebee, Bombus ternarius
    - Early bumblebee, Bombus pratorum
    - Buff-tailed bumblebee or large earth bumblebee, Bombus terrestris
- Eusociality
