= Usurper (disambiguation) =

A usurper is a person who makes an illegitimate or controversial claim to power.

Usurp, usurper, or usurpation may also refer to:

== Literature ==
- Conan the Usurper, a 1967 collection of fantasy stories
- Usurper!, a Way of the Tiger gamebook
- Usurpers, novel by Francisco Ayala
- War of the Usurper, name given by the Loyalists during Robert's Rebellion in World of Westeros

== Other ==
- HMS Usurper (P56), a Royal Navy Second World War submarine
- Usurp Synapse, a screamo band from Indiana
- Usurpation of Qi by Tian, a series of events between 481 and 379 BCE during which the Tian clan overthrew the Jiang clan in the ancient Chinese state of Qi
- Nest usurpation, when the queen of one species of eusocial insects takes over the colony of another species

== See also ==
- List of usurpers
- List of Roman usurpers
- Wikipedia:USURP
- Link rot, where if a link gets hijacked, it is called link usurpation
