= Bombus cornutus =

Scientific classification
- Kingdom: Animalia
- Phylum: Arthropoda
- Clade: Pancrustacea
- Class: Insecta
- Order: Hymenoptera
- Family: Apidae
- Genus: Bombus
- Subgenus: Psithyrus
- Species: B. cornutus

Binomial name
- Bombus cornutus (Frison, 1933)

Synonyms
- Psithyrus cornutus; Psithyrus acutisquameus Maa, 1948; Psithyrus pyramideus Maa, 1948; Psithyrus klapperichi Pittioni, 1949; Psithyrus canus Tkalcu, 1989

Species of bee

Bombus cornutus is a species of cuckoo bumblebee.
