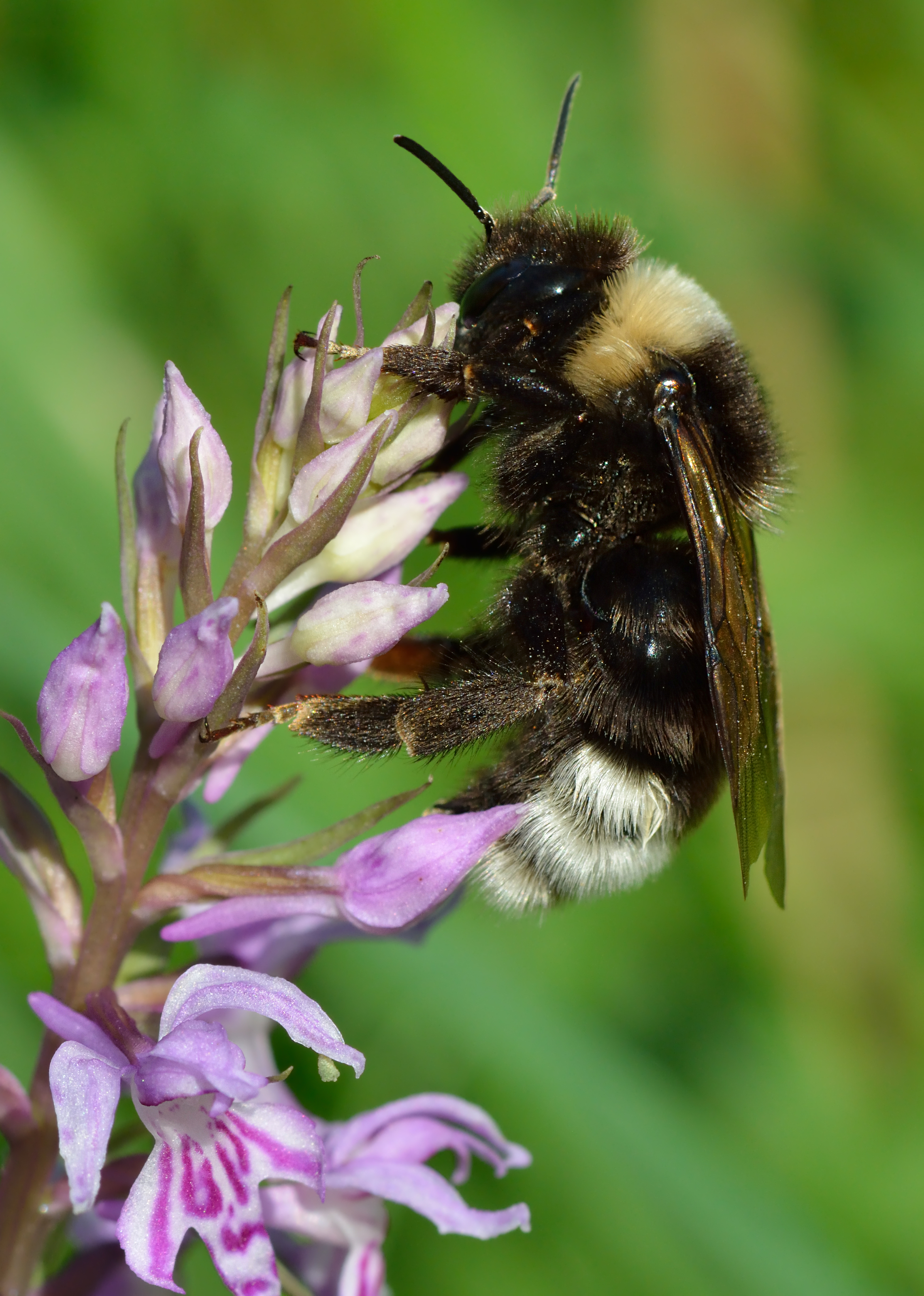
- Female
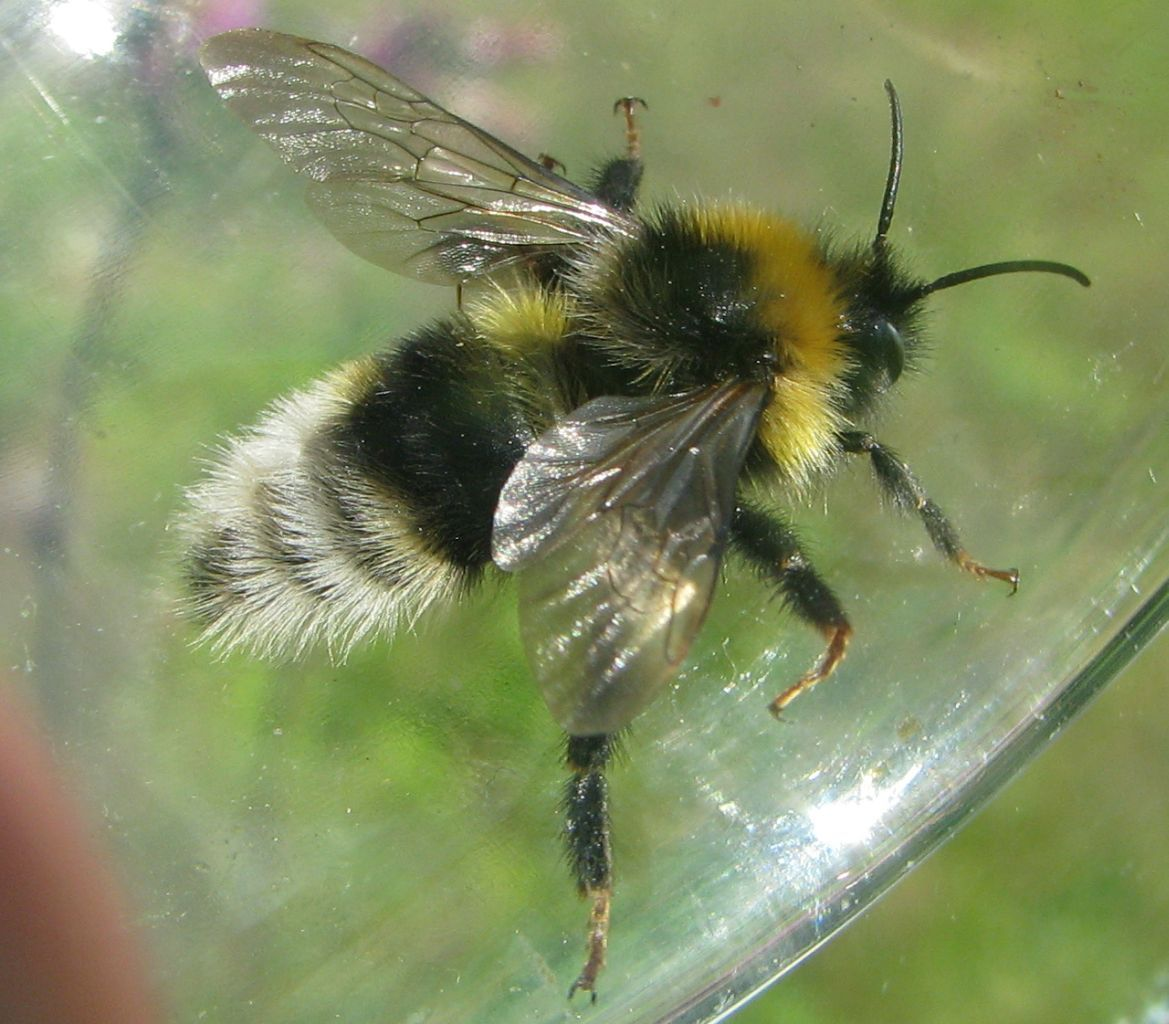
- Male

Conservation status
- Data Deficient (IUCN 3.1)

Scientific classification
- Kingdom: Animalia
- Phylum: Arthropoda
- Clade: Pancrustacea
- Class: Insecta
- Order: Hymenoptera
- Family: Apidae
- Genus: Bombus
- Species: B. bohemicus

Binomial name
- Bombus bohemicus Seidl, 1838

Synonyms
- Psithyrus bohemicus (Seidl, 1837)

= Bombus bohemicus =

Species of bee

Bombus bohemicus, also known as the gypsy's cuckoo bumblebee, is a species of socially parasitic cuckoo bumblebee found in most of Europe with the exception of the southern Iberian Peninsula and Iceland. B. bohemicus practices inquilinism, or brood parasitism, of other bumblebee species. B. bohemicus is a generalist parasite, successfully invading several species from genus Bombus. The invading queen mimics the host nest's chemical signals, allowing her to assume a reproductively dominant role as well as manipulation of host worker fertility and behavior.

== Taxonomy and phylogeny ==
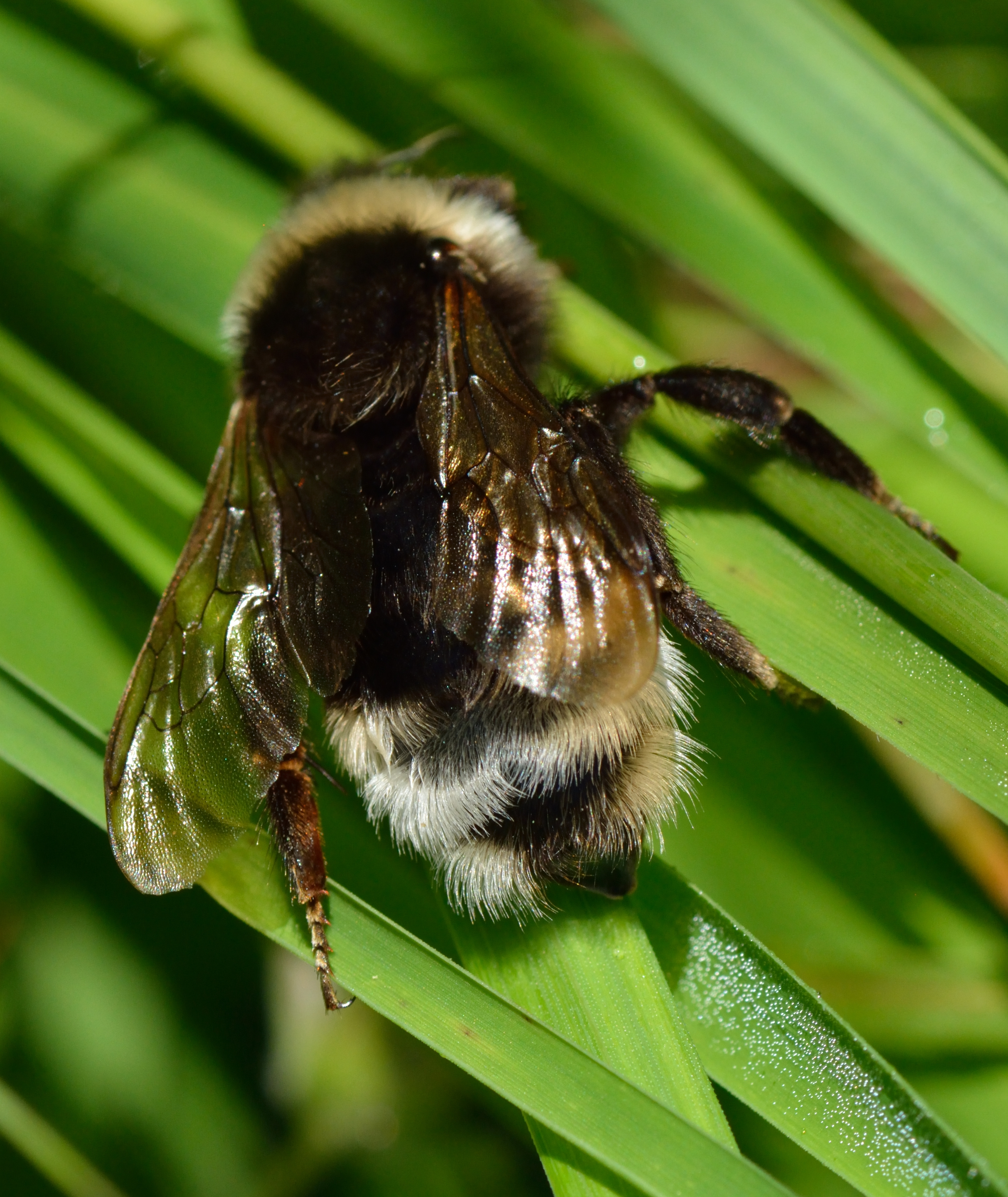

B. bohemicus is part of the order Hymenoptera, which includes ants, bees, wasps, and sawflies, the family Apidae, specific to bees, and the genus Bombus, which includes all bumblebees. B. bohemicus belongs to the subgenus Psithyrus, or the cuckoo bees, which includes 29 species found in Europe and the New World. Species in this subgenus are obligate parasites of other bumble bees. The females have lost their pollen-collecting corbiculae and their ability to rear their own brood. Cuckoo bees have also entirely eliminated the worker class, producing only reproductive males and females. This form of parasitism is known as inquilinism.

Psithyrus was historically considered a separate genus from Bombus due to the significant biological and morphological differences associated with its parasitic life cycle. However, the majority of phylogenetic research in the last few decades has supported the recent conclusion that Psithyrus is a monophyletic group within Bombus. Morphology and phylogenetic analysis supports a close relationship with Bombus ashtoni from North America, suggesting a recent speciation event, or even that these bee species actually represent geographically separated populations of the same species. In Europe, they are often confused with Bombus vestalis, since both are parasitic and are found in the same region. B. bohemicus can hence be identified by its more intense colors and the fact that it is a generalist when choosing its host.

== Description ==
Queens are around 15–20 mm in length with a round face and a short proboscis. Hair on the face and head is black, with a pale yellow collar that normally lacks any intermixed black hairs. The abdomen is mostly black, often with yellow hairs on the first tergite (abdominal segment), pale yellow sides on the third tergite and a white or pale yellow tail end. Males in northern Scotland sometimes have yellow tails instead of white. The defining physical trait in comparison to non-Cuckoo bumblebees is that B. bohemicus lacks corbiculae, or pollen sacks, on its posterior tibia, instead the area is covered in dense hair. Females have very thick cuticles, longer and more powerful stings, and larger venom sacs and Dufour's glands compared to its host species. Males are smaller, around 11–17 mm in length and similarly colored to females. Males are stingless. B. bohemicus does not produce any workers; instead, they enslave the host workers.

B. bohemicus does not exhibit any nest-building behavior; instead, they move into newly established host nests and usurp the host queen. B. bohemicus parasitizes three species: B. locurum, B. cryptarum, and B. terrestris.

== Distribution and habitat ==
B. Bohemicus is one of the most common Cuckoo bees in Europe. This bumblebee is distributed through most of Europe, from within the Arctic Circle to northern Spain and Greece and from Britain and Ireland in the west to eastern Russia. It is also found in Turkey. In Britain, it is common in the southwestern peninsula, northern England, and Scotland. In the southeastern part, however, it is rare (with exception of the East Anglian brecks). B. bohemicus lives in temperate climates and is found in the same temperate habitats as its host bee species, allowing for easier access to host nests. However, it does show differences from its hosts in flower preference for foraging. This is likely due to the fact that it forages solely for nectar, and it differs in the timing of foraging behavior during its life cycle. It prefers to forage in scrub-type flowering plants.

In analyses of population densities of both host bees and B. bohemicus, there appears to be a threshold host population density at which the parasites are able to maintain a presence. This threshold has not been accurately quantified, but areas of low host population density have been observed to be free of cuckoo-bee parasites.

== Colony cycle ==
=== Host nest selection ===
Fertilized B. bohemicus queens emerge from hibernation in April several weeks after the queens of their host species, so that the hosts have already established new nests and produced an initial brood of workers. Before locating a host nest, the queen forages on flowers for a short time while her ovaries develop. The queen will select and invade a host hive by the end of May. Nest-searching flights are used to locate possible host nests, and the nests are identified as belonging to suitable hosts by species-specific chemical signals, or "trail pheromones" consisting of volatile hydrocarbons of varying lengths, given off by the host bees. Evidence suggests that cuckoo-bees are able to detect quantitative and qualitative differences in these scent markers that provide information about various colony characteristics, possibly allowing host nest discrimination based upon colony size and overall health. Nest-searching queens have been observed visiting several different potential host nests before selecting one to invade, further supporting the hypothesis that they are able to discriminate nests based on potential viability.

B. bohemicus is a generalist parasite, invading the nests of B. locurum, B. cryptarum, and B. terrestris, and so is attracted to the chemical signals of any of these potential host species. This generalist approach gives B. bohemicus more options, which has allowed it to occupy such a large geographical area, but it also has a lower success rate than other members of Psithyrus.

=== Colony initiation ===
Artificially introduced B. bohemicus queens consistently did not encounter aggressive host defense responses, while other parasitic species were consistently attacked when similarly introduced. Within the first hour of introduction, host queens showed no observable response, while host workers approached but never attacked the unfamiliar bee.

When B. bohemicus females were artificially introduced to freely-foraging early-stage colonies of B. lucorum, the introduced female refused to remain with the host nest, despite a lack of host bee response, suggesting a specific selection mechanism, rather than random selection or simply the one initially encountered, that is not fully understood. When selecting a host nest, B. bohemicus queens preferentially attack larger host nests, but the size of nest invaded (measured by number of host bees) is correlated to the mortality rate of the invading queen. Smaller nests, which contain fewer workers, will produce fewer, and smaller, reproductive B. bohemicus. This nest preference represents a trade-off between the relative ease of invading a smaller nest and the benefits that come from the increased resources of larger nests.

A single queen will move into a host nest, usurping and sometimes killing the host queen. After several days, the invading queen begins ejecting host larvae from their brood cells and eating host eggs and then begin to lay her own eggs into host-constructed wax cells after another few days. B. bohemicus and other Psithyrus queens have a more powerful sting and mandibles as well as generally thicker exoskeleton than their hosts, granting an advantage in conflicts. These invasions are usually successful if they occur before the second batch of workers has been produced. The invading queen eats the eggs or larvae of the host queen, although they will frequently let more-developed larvae and existing workers survive to allow for a sufficient workforce. The invading queen allows the growth of a sufficient number of host workers, typically one or two broods, to perform the necessary tasks of a functional nest. After a period of waiting, the new queen begins to lay her own eggs.

B. bohemicus will sometimes allow the original host queen to remain in the invaded hive. The queen is marginalized within the hive and is the recipient of the majority of the parasite's dominance behavior, but continues to perform grooming and brood-tending behaviors and may even continue laying her own eggs, which will be promptly eaten by the parasite queen, preserving her reproductive dominance. Reasons influencing whether or not the host queen is killed is unclear, but there is evidence that the invading queen is better able to maintain dominance over the workers when the host queen remains alive and in the nest. During observations, when the host queen reproductive dominance over the workers is lost (characterized by sexual maturation of the workers and associated behavioral changes), the B. bohemicus queen also loses dominance and she and her brood become the objects of worker aggression.

== Behavior ==
=== Dominance behavior ===
During the first few days of occupation, prior to beginning to lay her eggs, an invading queen will attempt to establish dominance by acting aggressively towards host queen and workers. This behavior includes physically pushing the other bees around, as well as demonstrating "mauling" behavior, which consists of grabbing the victim as if to sting it, then releasing without actually stinging. Though this behavior is performed towards both the host queen and workers, it is directed at the queen (versus all workers combined) about 62% of the time.

In addition to physical dominance, the invading queen attempts to establish reproductive dominance by eating host eggs and ejecting larvae. To eject host larvae, the queen uncovers the larvae and removes them from the brood clump, dropping them outside the brood-rearing area, where they are subsequently carried away from the hive by host workers. If the uncovering and removal process is interrupted by the approach of a host worker, the queen will stop and move away from the cell, which will likely be repaired by the worker. After the worker has moved on, the queen will resume the ejection behavior.

=== Division of labor ===
B. bohemicus maintains the division of labor in the host nest, as it does not produce any workers to perform foraging, brood-rearing, or defensive tasks.

During its time in the host nest, the B. bohemicus queen performs some brood care tasks, participating in feeding and brood incubation. To feed the larvae that are sealed in wax cells, either the B. bohemicus queen or host workers bite a hole in the cell wall and then regurgitate pollen inside. This pollen comes from nearby pollen storage receptacles in the hive and was originally collected by foraging host workers.

=== Host worker reproductive suppression ===
In addition to dominating the host queen, B. bohemicus suppresses host worker fertility, particularly male production, by physical and chemical means. However, this suppression is more effective in the presence of a cohabitant host queen. B. bohemicus must stabilize its presence as the dominant reproductive female, so workers continue nursing behaviors and do not begin to lay their own eggs. The invading queen demonstrates oophagy, particularly of male eggs, allowing some females to survive to become additional workers. The queen produces a combination of chemicals that mimic the fertility signals of the host queen, specifically wax-type esters, tetracosyl oleate, and hexacosyl oleate. These chemical signals are transferred to nearby workers via physical contact in the form of non-aggressive body rubbing. These signals mimic those of reproductively active host queens, suppressing ovarian development of the host workers. No significant difference has been found between worker reproductive suppression by native queens and invading queens, illustrating the effectiveness of the chemical mimicry.

=== Chemical mimicry ===
B. bohemicus mimics the cuticular hydrocarbons of the host bumblebee, facilitating entry into the nest. However, this mimicry of its host is imperfect in comparison to other members of Psithyrus, likely due to its variability of host. This likely contributes to B. bohemicus's relatively low invasion success rate compared to other members of Psithyrus. B. bohemicus also produces dodecyl acetate, which is a known worker-repellent, to aid its safe entry into the nest. In the first 24 hours after invasion, host workers undergo a significant change in their chemical bouquets, finishing with a qualitatively similar chemical mix to the invasive queen. Two hypotheses exist for this outcome. The first is that the workers begin to produce their own chemicals in an arms-race pattern to assume reproductive roles in response to the death of their native queen, which happens under normal conditions if a queen dies. The second hypothesis is that these chemicals are in fact applied to workers' bodies by the invasive queen as she takes over to establish herself as the reproductively dominant individual.

=== Male offspring survival ===
The small and stingless males lack the physical defensive abilities of females, as well as a Dufour's gland to produce mimicking chemical signals. Additionally, males are more easily recognizable as a different species due to their species-specific cephalic secretions that serve as their sexual marking pheromones. In response, B. bohemicus and other Psithyrus bumblebees have incorporated worker-repellant chemicals into their cephalic secretions, which reduce host worker aggression towards male young. It is hypothesized that during reproduction, males transfer some of these chemicals to females, which in turn aids in future infiltration into host nests the following cycle.

=== Mating behavior ===
Mating occurs in mid to late summer. B. bohemicus shows a 1:1 offspring sex ratio, consistent with production of only reproductively active offspring.

=== Loss of dominance ===
At any point during the invasion or brood rearing process, B. bohemicus may lose dominance. When this occurs, host workers will begin to eat or eject the parasite brood. The parasite queen will attempt to defend her brood by pushing host workers away while buzzing aggressively, and with frequent cell examination. However, she will likely be overwhelmed and her brood eaten or ejected. This loss of dominance is likely tied to the loss of dominance by the host queen in cases where she survived invasion and remained in the nest, though the nature of this association is not understood. This loss of dominance is characterized by the maturation of worker ovaries as they become reproductively active. The invasive queen is not necessarily killed after dominance is lost, but may remain in the hive, either incubating host cocoons or sitting inactively beside the comb.

== Life history ==
New reproductive males and females emerge from the nest from late June onward to mate. Queens hibernate through the winter once they have been fertilized. Males may be seen until late September, after the conclusion of reproduction, eventually all dying before the onset of winter.

== Mimicry and camouflage ==
B. bohemicus is similar in appearance to its host B. terrestris species. Since bees identify nest members by scent and other chemical signals, rather than visual appearance, this similarity is instead considered to be Müllerian mimicry. More important to their success as parasites is their ability to chemically camouflage within their host nest to avoid detection and repulsion during their initial entry.

== Interaction with other species ==
B. bohemicus is an obligate parasite, and so it is almost always found in association with a host nest. It parasitizes Bombus locurum, Bombus cryptarum, and Bombus terrestris. In the short time that B. bohemicus is independently foraging, it feeds on the nectar of flowering plants. It shows preference to a diverse selection of scrub-type food plants across its large geographical range, such as: thyme, scabious, knapweed, ling, lavender, masterwort, marsh, and thistles for the male, and sallow, dandelion, clover, bilberry, sycamore, cornflowers, bistort, bugle, thyme, cotoneaster, heath, and raspberry for the female. After invading the host nest, it will be fed by the foraging host workers according to their particular foraging habits.

== Human interaction and agriculture ==
B. bohemicus does not act as a pollinator, as it has lost its pollen-collecting corbiculae and produces no worker females. Interaction with humans is minimal, as B. bohemicus individuals are only rarely found outside of nests, and do not exhibit aggressive behavior towards humans unless disturbed.
