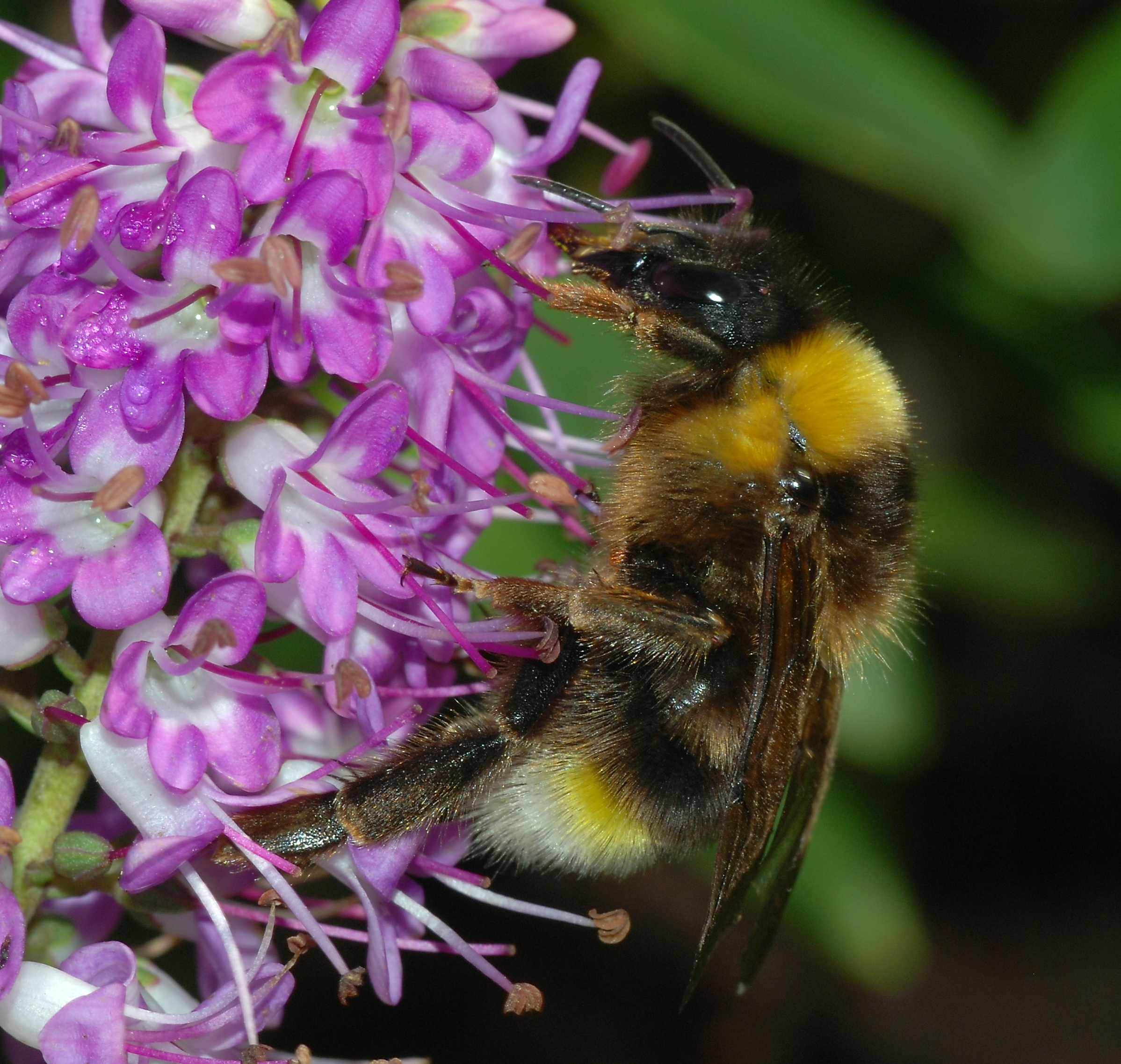

Scientific classification
- Kingdom: Animalia
- Phylum: Arthropoda
- Class: Insecta
- Order: Hymenoptera
- Family: Apidae
- Genus: Bombus
- Species: B. vestalis

Binomial name
- Bombus vestalis Geoffroy, 1785

= Bombus vestalis =

Vestal cuckoo bumblebee

Species of bee

Bombus vestalis, the vestal cuckoo bumblebee, is a species of cuckoo bumblebee that lives in most of Europe, as well as North Africa and western Asia. It is a brood parasite that takes over the nests of other bee species. Its primary host is Bombus terrestris (the buff-tailed bumblebee). After its initial classification as Psithyrus vestalis, this bumblebee was recently reclassified into the genus Bombus, subgenus Psithyrus.

== Description ==
The queen is a large bumblebee with a length up to 21 mm (0.83 in) and a wingspan of 37 mm (1.5 in); the male is considerably smaller (16 mm (0.63 in)). The bumblebee is predominantly black, with an orange collar. The third tergite has a border of yellow hairs, and the hairs on the fifth tergite are mostly white. The males are similar to the females, but smaller and with longer antennae.

It is similar in appearance to another cuckoo bumblebee, Bombus bohemicus, but is distinguishable by either the length of the antennal segments or dissection and comparison of the genitalia. In Bombus vestalis, the fifth antennal segment will be the same length as the third and fourth together.

A key characteristic of Bombus vestalis is the lack of corbiculae or a pollen basket on the hind legs of the bee. This is evolutionarily relevant because Bombus vestalis does not make its own nests or collect its own resources. With its larger body and poor foraging skills, the female Bombus vestalis are adapted to taking over nests of other species which have already been made and using the workers in these colonies to collect pollen.

=== Sex ===
A brood of bees successfully raised by Bombus vestalis is mainly female. This is evolutionarily beneficial since the female is the sex which takes over host species and allows Bombus vestalis to reproduce. In fact, many of the male bees which are hatched in a nest that has been taken over by Bombus vestalis are a result of host workers who were able to successfully lay eggs despite the aggression of the invaders. Although they display haplodiploidy where males are haploid and females are diploid, morphologically, male and female Bombus vestalis are very similar and can be classified with a mosaic gynander. They have similar mandible and body structures, and it is likely that the differences are only derived from chromosomal alterations during development of the embryo.

== Taxonomy and phylogeny ==
Bombus vestalis is part of the family Apidae. Until recently, it used to be identified as Psithryus vestalis. It was then renamed under the genus Bombus and classified as subgenus Psithyrus. The subgenus Psithyrus refers to a variety of cuckoo bumblebees who have no worker caste and reproduce by taking over host colonies and using workers of those colonies to rear their young. They can be confused with the bee Bombus bohemicus since both are found in similar regions and are parasitic in behavior. However, Bombus bohemicus is more intense in color and is a generalist parasite when choosing its host.

== Distribution ==
The bumblebee is common from North Africa in the south to southern Sweden in the north, and from Ireland in the west to northern Iran in the east. It is common throughout England and Wales, but has only been sighted in Scotland since 2009. Using data from the National Biodiversity Network gateway, Bombus vestalis is most prominent in south-east England.

In Ireland the bee was believed to be all but extinct in the 20th century with the last recorded sighting in 1926 in Carlow. However, in 2014 a population was rediscovered in the walled garden at Saint Enda's Park in Rathfarnham.

== Ecology ==
Bombus vestalis is a cuckoo bumblebee; it does not construct any nest of its own, but usurps the nest of Bombus terrestris, kills the host queen, and forces the host workers to raise its offspring. The male bumblebees often congregate in gardens in the suburbs.

The queen emerges early in the spring; the males emerge later, in late May to early June. Its food sources are flowering plants such as clover (males especially often visit white clover), tufted vetch, knapweed, and others. In the spring, the emerging queens frequently fly to flowers such as deadnettles, sallows, blackthorns, and dandelions.

== Life cycle ==
The life cycle of Bombus vestalis is dependent on its host B. terrestris, who begin the growth of their colony in the early spring, slowly building up the nest. The female Bombus vestalis hibernates until April, after the host has raised a first generation of workers. At this point, the nest is an ideal size for the female B. vestalis to take over. In taking over the nest, the invaders assert their dominance among the workers bees for the first few days without killing the queen. It takes nearly a month for B. vestalis to fully take over the nest and raise her brood.

== Behavior ==
=== Mating behavior ===
Male Bombus vestalis have been found to be attracted to floral odors, particularly the polar compounds of Ophrys flowers, which mimic the sex pheromones of virgin females. In short, olfactory cues play an essential role to attract males, for virgin female Bombus vestalis, and their sexually deceptive orchid mimics, O. chestermanii and O. normanii. For these orchid mimics, the males are attracted to their floral cues, which leads to the male attempting to copulate with the orchid labellum, during which the flower is pollinated.

=== Single host parasitism ===
Under the subgenus Psithyrus, there are two types of parasitic bees; one type of bee is non-specific when choosing its host and the other (e.g., B. vestalis) chooses an exclusive host. These two different behaviors are likely to have developed because of a chemical difference in pheromones. Socially parasitic bees have been shown to identify their hosts through pheromone trails left by host workers while they are collecting pollen. By following these natural footprints, a parasitic bee can find the entrance to the hive of its desired host. Experiments show that B. vestalis is attracted to a specific combination of both nonpolar and polar pheromones, a combination that is specific to B. terrestris. Though the latter can be parasitized by other bees, B. vestalis will not take over the nests of any other species. It can also distinguish the odors of differently aged host workers, thus determining which workers to attack when invading a nest.

==== Identifying colony size ====
The success of Bombus vestalis is dependent on the size of the nest which it invades. As soon as a female enters a colony, she is investigated by the workers and often faces attacks from them. Larger colonies will have more workers who are capable of defending the nest. Thus a female B. vestalis must weigh the costs of parasitizing a nest when the colony is very large. Experiments have been done to reproduce this scenario. However, B. vestalis cannot take over a nest which is too small. During an invasion of a small nest, though successful, too many host workers will die and there will be a shortage of workers to take care of the invading queen and her eggs. Before attacking a colony, the female must accurately judge the size of the nest, through the frequency and size of workers moving in and out, and the pheromones of these workers before attempting an attack.

==== Identifying colony age ====
In experiments with B. vestalis and its host B. terrestris, an interesting phenomenon has been observed. Any host workers born after the invasion of a female B. vestalis were unharmed despite the takeover of the queen. Similarly, newborn B. terrestris were not attacked during the invasion. A female B. vestalis will only target older host worker bees who are a threat to her and her eggs. She is able to identify these workers through the detection of pheromones. The older a terrestris worker is, the more pheromones it secretes. Since B. vestalis is so perceptive of these odors, she knows which worker bees to kill so that the brood of eggs is safely and solely her own. The remaining younger Bombus terrestris and those born soon after takeover of the queen are available to help care for the new B. vestalis nest.

=== Mauling ===
Many parasitic bees use mimicry to introduce themselves into the nests of their hosts. They mimic the odor of the host and oftentimes live in cooperation with the host species when raising their eggs. This is more common in larger colonies. Bombus vestalis is unique in that it has a mauling behavior. With a smaller colony to take over, the female B. vestalis can individually kill off the workers in the B. terrestris nest. When it comes to the queen, she may simply push her off the nest. This behavior is evolutionarily possible because Bombus terrestris nests are not too large and because Bombus vestalis invades early in the season. It will then suppress ovarian development of the remaining workers.

== See also ==
- List of bumblebee species
- Eusociality
