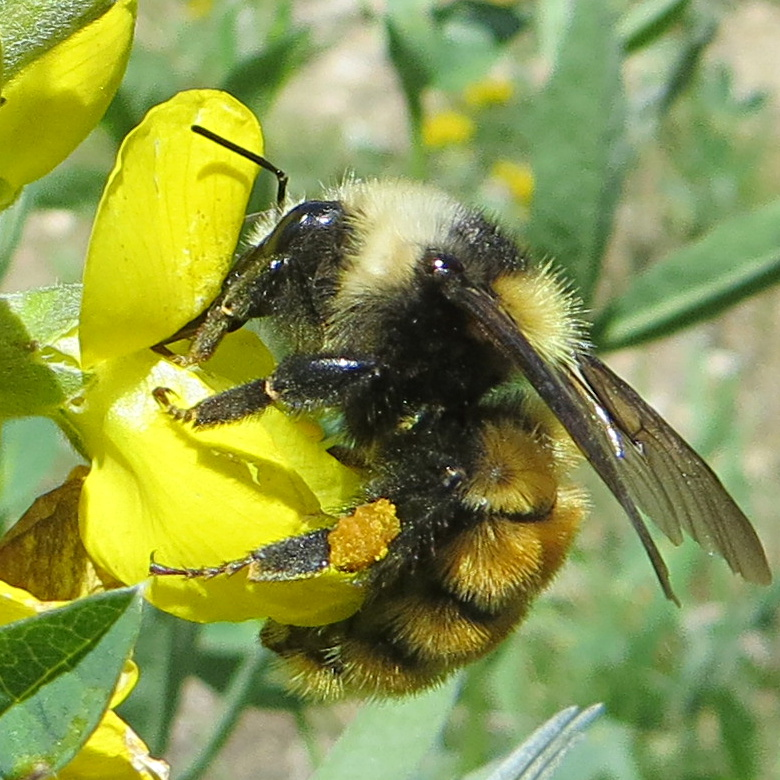

Conservation status
- Least Concern (IUCN 3.1)

Scientific classification
- Kingdom: Animalia
- Phylum: Arthropoda
- Clade: Pancrustacea
- Class: Insecta
- Order: Hymenoptera
- Family: Apidae
- Genus: Bombus
- Subgenus: Subterraneobombus
- Species: B. appositus

Binomial name
- Bombus appositus Cresson, 1878

= Bombus appositus =

Species of bee

Bombus appositus is a species of bumblebee known commonly as the white-shouldered bumblebee. It is native to western North America, including western Canada and the western United States.

This species lives in open habitat, such as meadows and slopes. It nests underground or on the surface. Males congregate to seek mates. It feeds on a variety of plant taxa, including giant hyssops, thistles, gentians, owl's clovers, locoweeds, penstemons, and clovers. It especially favors subalpine larkspur (Delphinium barbeyi) and it serves as one of the plant's main pollinators.

This species has a range from southwestern Canada south to the Cascade Mountains and the Sierra Nevada, and west to central California.

This species is a host to Bombus insularis, a species of cuckoo bumblebee.
