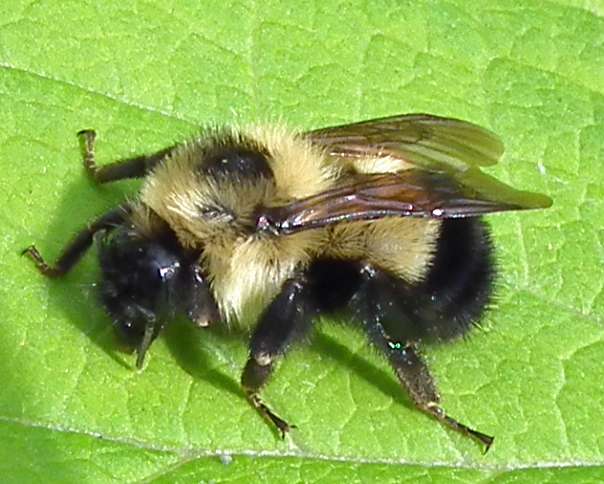

Conservation status
- Least Concern (IUCN 3.1)

Scientific classification
- Kingdom: Animalia
- Phylum: Arthropoda
- Clade: Pancrustacea
- Class: Insecta
- Order: Hymenoptera
- Family: Apidae
- Genus: Bombus
- Subgenus: Pyrobombus
- Species: B. vagans

Binomial name
- Bombus vagans Smith, 1854

= Bombus vagans =

Species of bee

The half-black bumblebee (Bombus vagans) is a small bumblebee with a wide distribution in North America, its range extending from Ontario to Nova Scotia and southward to Georgia. An endemic subspecies of this bee, known as Bolster's bumblebee (B. vagans ssp. bolsteri), occurs on the eastern Canadian island of Newfoundland.

== Description ==
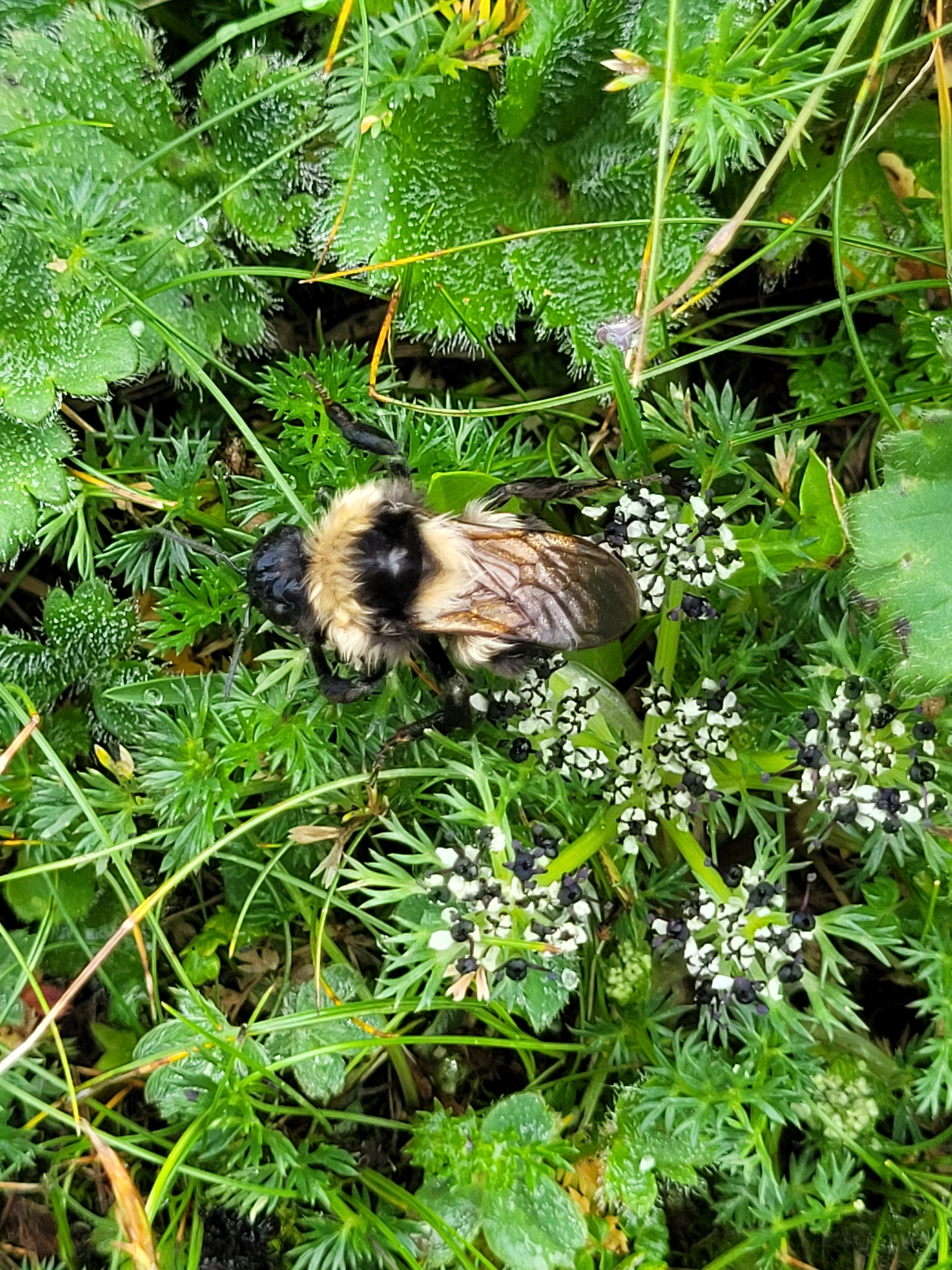
Half Black Bumblebee found near Bhrigu Lake, Manali Pradesh

Bombus vagans is a common species of bumblebee with a medium-length tongue. The head, thorax and first two segments of the abdomen are yellow, while the rest of the abdomen is black. The face has a mixture of yellow and black hair,s and the thorax is densely clad in shaggy yellow hair except for a smooth central portion which is bare and shiny. The first two abdominal segments bear yellow hairs, and the remainder of the abdomen is clad in black hairs. The underside of this bee and the legs are black. Similar species with which it can be confused include Bombus sandersoni (which is slightly smaller), Bombus perplexus, Bombus impatiens and Bombus affinis.

== Behavior ==
This bee comes out from hibernation quite late in the year, with the first queens being seen in early May in Maine, and workers being on the wing from June to August. but in more southerly locations, it may be seen a month earlier than this. The queen favors apple and plum blossom while the workers appreciate red clover, Penstemon, Asclepias (milkweed), Cirsium (thistle), Eupatorium and Spiraea (meadowsweet). Unlike most other bumblebee species in the region, it forages in shady forest habitats. Drones are often seen late in the season on aster and goldenrod.

Nests are usually located on the ground surface or in underground holes, and at their peak, the colony may have approximately seventy workers. The nest is sometimes parasitized by the cuckoo bumblebee Bombus citrinus. The parasitic protozoon Apicystis bombi sometimes parasitizes this species.
