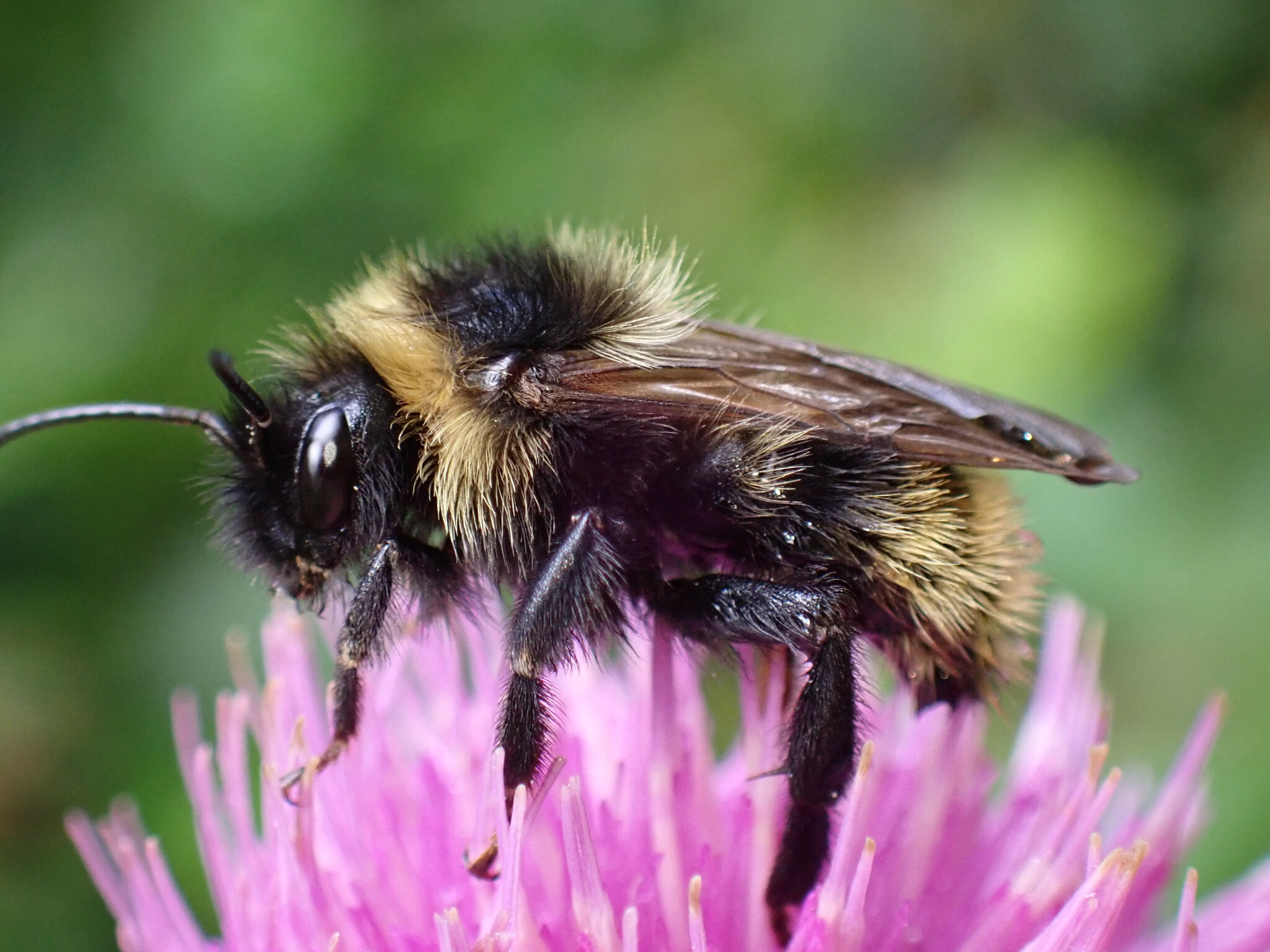
- Rødekro, Denmark, 2023

Conservation status
- Least Concern (IUCN 3.1)

Scientific classification
- Kingdom: Animalia
- Phylum: Arthropoda
- Clade: Pancrustacea
- Class: Insecta
- Order: Hymenoptera
- Family: Apidae
- Genus: Bombus
- Subgenus: Psithyrus
- Species: B. campestris

Binomial name
- Bombus campestris (Panzer, 1801)

Synonyms
- Apathus campestris; Apis arvorum Panzer, 1804; Apis campestris Panzer, 1801; Apis francisana Kirby, 1802; Apis leeana Kirby, 1802; Apis rossiella Kirby, 1802; Psithyrus campestris (Panzer, 1801)

= Bombus campestris =

Species of bee

Bombus campestris is a very common cuckoo bumblebee found in most of Europe.

== Description ==
The bumblebee is of medium length, the queen having an average length of 18 mm (0.7 in), and the male 15 mm (0.6 in). The fur of the queen is quite thin on the dorsal (upper) side. The collar, and in some cases the top of the head, is orange-yellow, while the terga (abdominal segments) 3–5 have yellow sides with a black centre; the rest of the body is black. The fur of the male is more variable: A pale form exists, with a broad, pale yellow collar, yellow hairs on top of the head, pale hairs on the sides of the otherwise black first tergite, a yellow line along the posterior rim, terga 3–6 pale yellow, usually with a black, thin, centre line. As for the queen, the rest of the body is black. The dark form is entirely black except for a thin, diffuse band on the collar and yellow hairs on the sides of terga 4–6. Intermediate forms exist. Both queens and males can be melanistic. In western Scotland, the subspecies B. c. swynnertoni is found, with a queen with an almost entirely pale yellow thorax, yellow hairs on terga 1 and 2, and a yellow tail. The male has more black on the thorax, but a lot of yellow on the abdomen.

== Ecology ==
Its main hosts are bumblebees of the subgenus Thoracobombus such as Bombus pascuorum (common carder bee). In continental Europe, it also parasitizes nests of brown-banded carder bees (Bombus humilis) and early bumblebees (Bombus pratorum; although the latter is a Pyrobombus, not a Thoracobombus).

Both sexes visit green alkanet, devil's-bit scabious, and thistle flowers. The queen also flies to dandelion, red clover, germander speedwell, and ground ivy, while the male feeds on bramble and knapweed.

== Distribution ==
B. campestris can be found in most of Europe from the middle of Fennoscandia in the north to northern Spain, southern Italy, and Greece, and from the British Isles in the west to easternmost Russia. In Britain, it is mostly found in England and Wales, and its distribution is patchy in Scotland.
