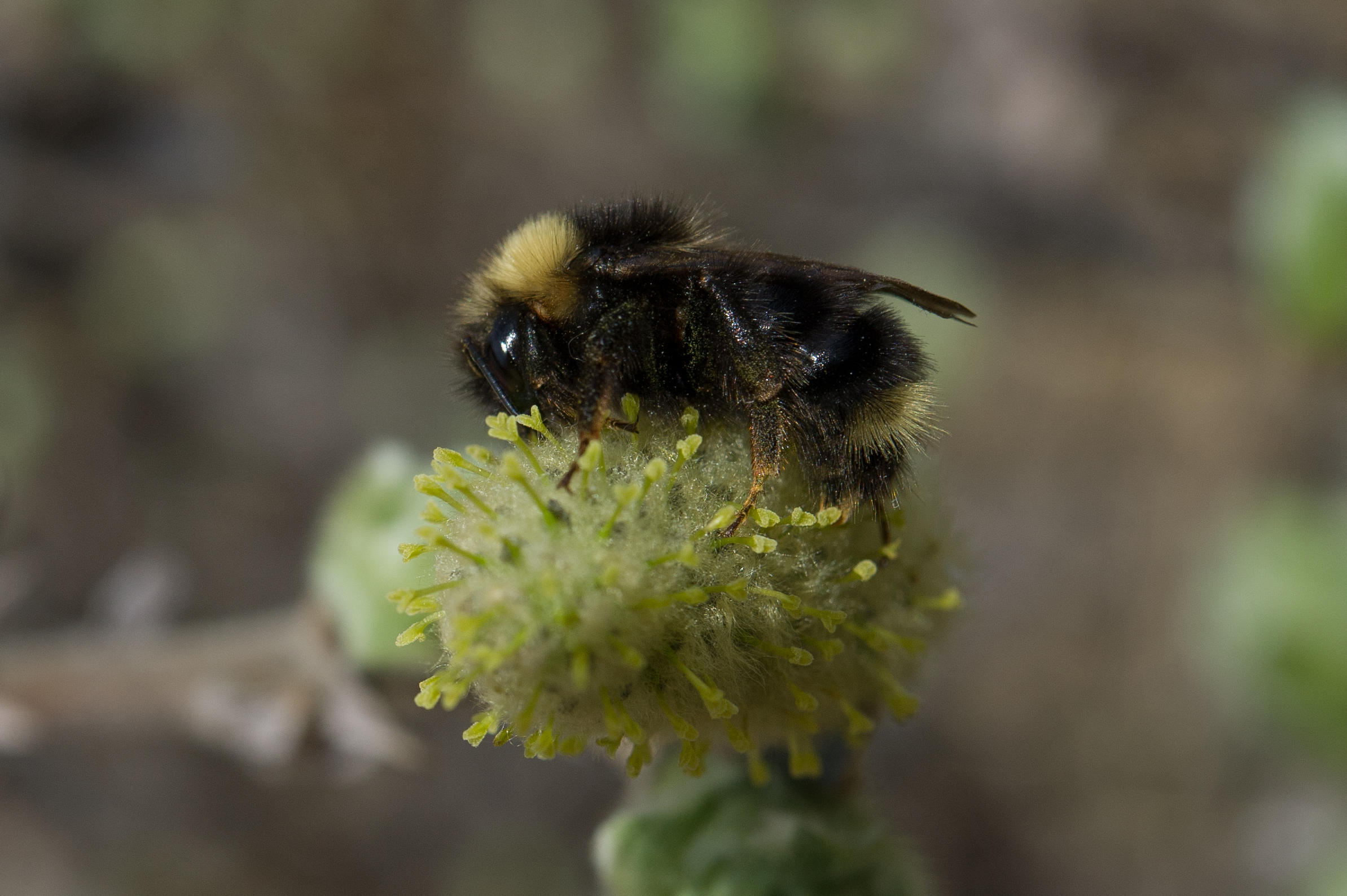

Conservation status
- Data Deficient (IUCN 3.1)

Scientific classification
- Kingdom: Animalia
- Phylum: Arthropoda
- Class: Insecta
- Order: Hymenoptera
- Family: Apidae
- Genus: Bombus
- Subgenus: Psithyrus
- Species: B. flavidus

Binomial name
- Bombus flavidus Eversmann, 1852

= Bombus flavidus =

Species of insect

Bombus flavidus is a species of cuckoo bumblebee found in Austria, Finland, France, Germany, Italy, Poland, Slovenia, Spain, and Switzerland.
