= Nest usurpation =

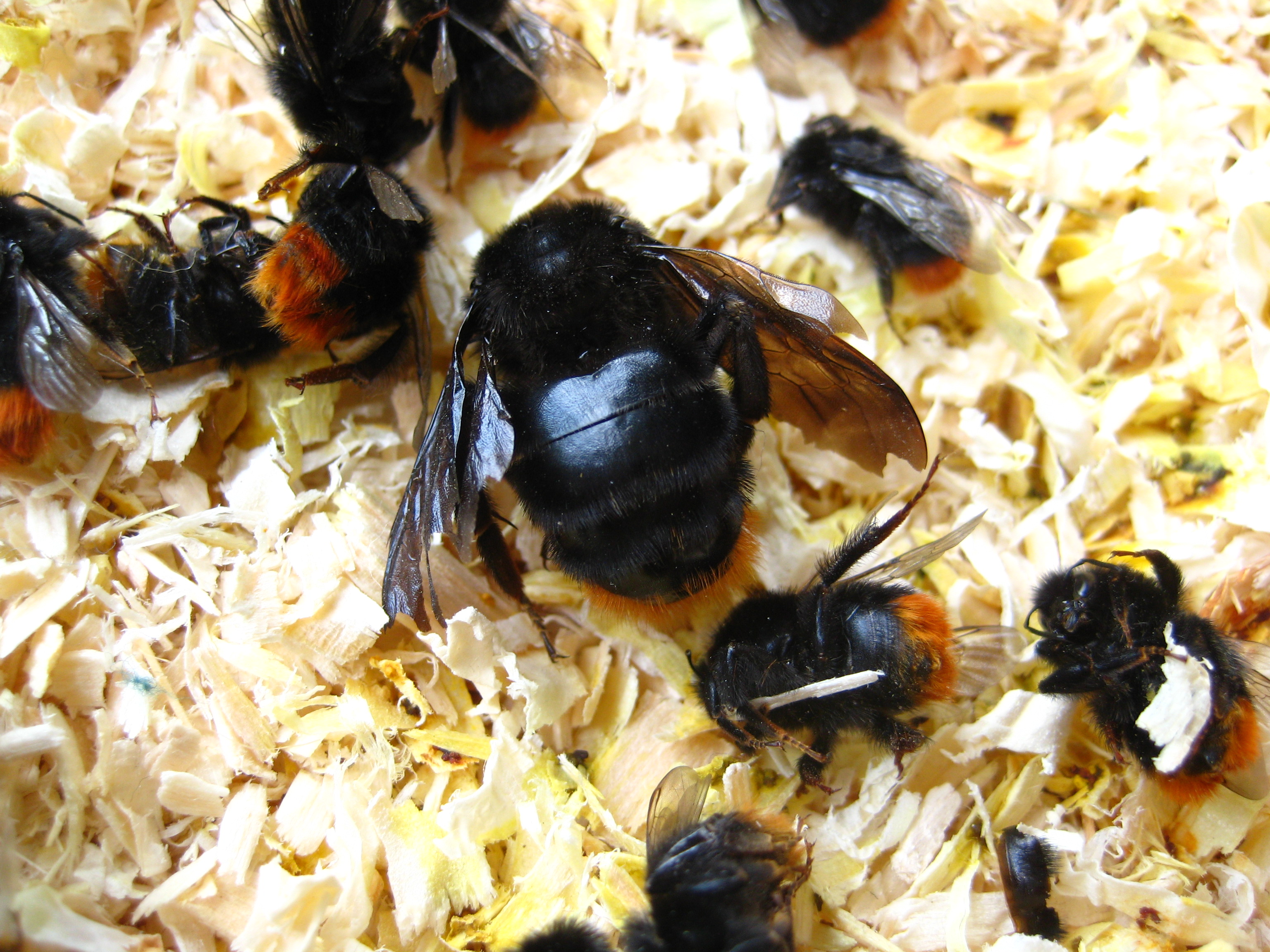
Bombus rupestris, a cuckoo bumblebee, killed by members of the Bombus lapidarius nest it was trying to usurp (image includes red-tailed Bombus lapidarius workers who died defending their nest)

Nest usurpation is when the queen of one species of eusocial insects takes over the colony of another species.

Cuckoo bumblebees (Psithyrus) and cuckoo paper wasps (Polistes) are known for usurpation.

Nest usurpation most frequently occurs during the late pre-emergence stage of a nest. A foundress is a member of one species, usually female that finds a nest in the late pre-emergence stage and takes control of the colony of that nest. The usurper or queen is a member of one species, usually female that gives raise to and controls the colony of a particular nest. Usurpation can include killing the true queen, after which the usurper queen lays eggs then exploits the host workers (thus, no workers exist within the usurper species) to feed her and her developing young (brood parasitism) through pheromones and/or physical attacks.

Among Metapolybia cingulata, it is very common to observe queens taking over other M. cingulata colonies, however it has also been noted that if the two colonies are similar enough, the exchange of workers or queens can be relatively smooth.
