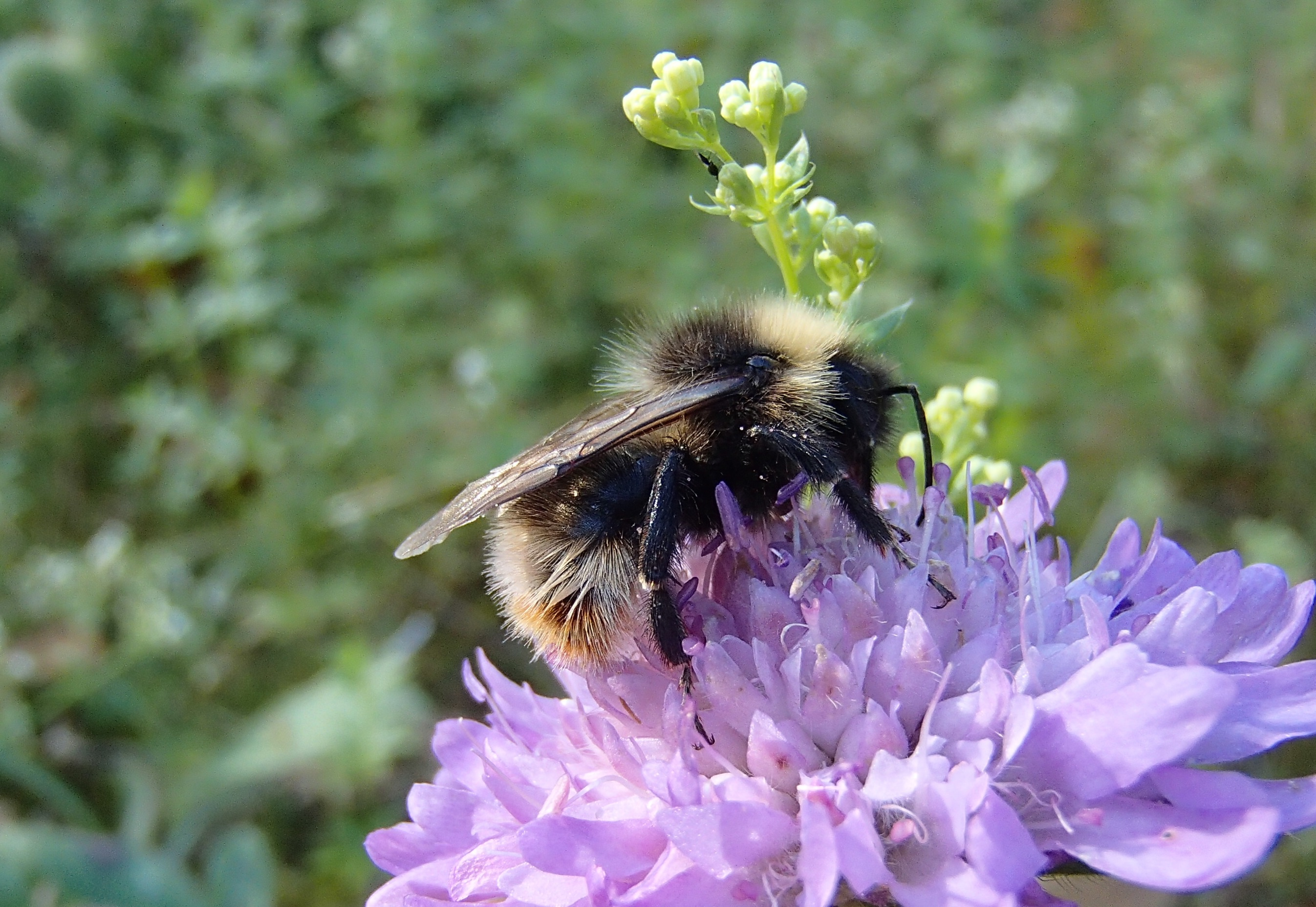

Scientific classification
- Kingdom: Animalia
- Phylum: Arthropoda
- Class: Insecta
- Order: Hymenoptera
- Family: Apidae
- Genus: Bombus
- Subgenus: Psithyrus
- Species: B. quadricolor

Binomial name
- Bombus quadricolor (Lepeletier, 1832)

= Bombus quadricolor =

Species of bee

Bombus quadricolor is a species of cuckoo bumblebee.

The bumblebee is present in most of Europe except Britain, Ireland, and Iceland. It is also found in Turkey.
