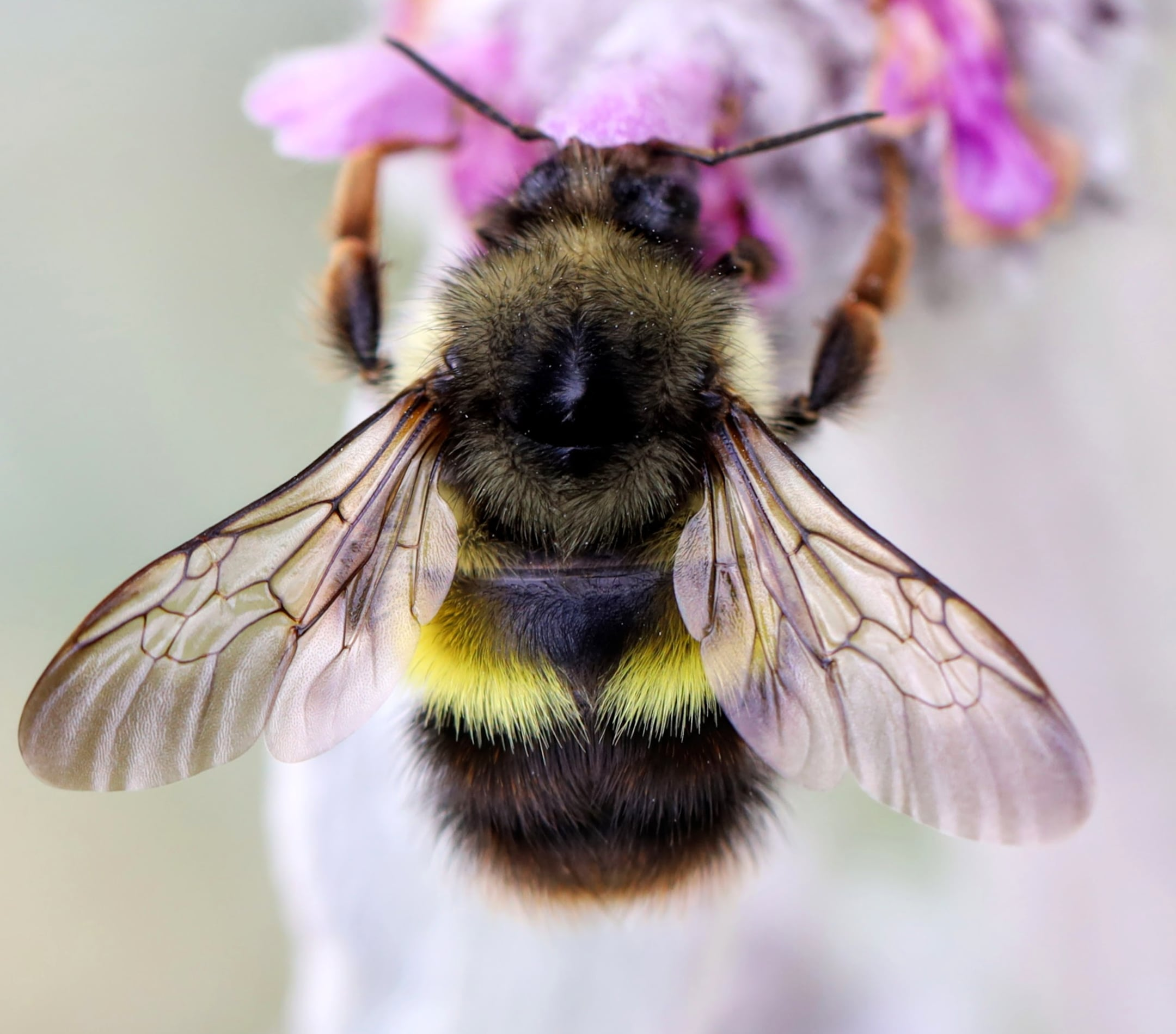

Conservation status
- Least Concern (IUCN 3.1)

Scientific classification
- Kingdom: Animalia
- Phylum: Arthropoda
- Clade: Pancrustacea
- Class: Insecta
- Order: Hymenoptera
- Family: Apidae
- Genus: Bombus
- Subgenus: Pyrobombus
- Species: B. flavifrons

Binomial name
- Bombus flavifrons Cresson, 1863

= Bombus flavifrons =

Species of bee

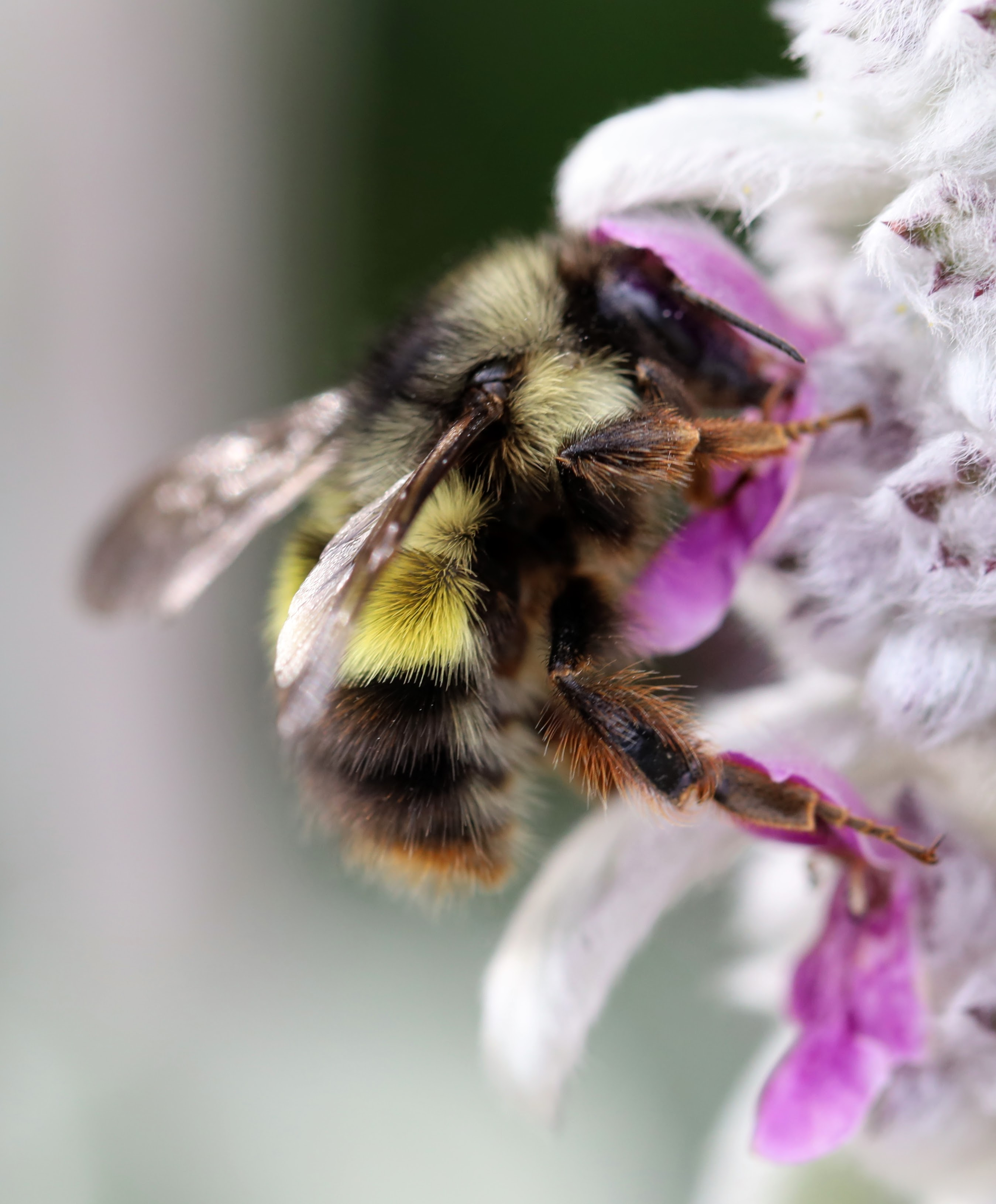
Bombus flavifrons in Washington state

Bombus flavifrons, the yellow-fronted bumble bee or yellowhead bumblebee, is a species of bumblebee. It is native to North America, where it is distributed across much of Canada, Alaska, and the western contiguous United States.

== Description ==
This is a robust bumblebee; the queen has a body length between 13 and 16 mm (0.51 and 0.63 in) and a wingspan of 27 to 34 mm (1.1 to 1.3 in), the male is 11 to 12 mm (0.43 to 0.47 in) in length with a wingspan of 25 to 26 mm (0.98 to 1.02 in), and the workers are 9 to 12 mm (0.35 to 0.47 in) in length and 19 to 27 mm (0.75 to 1.06 in) in wingspan.

The yellow-fronted bumble bee has a dense, untidy fur. The head is yellow with black hairs intermixed on the posterior part, the thorax has a mixed black and yellow colouration, often (always with the queen) with a black, central field. The first two terga (abdominal segments) are yellow, on the females often with a black, central field on terga 1 to 2. Terga 3 and 4 are red, and the tail black, sometimes with yellow fields.

Subspecies

Subspecies include:

- B. f. dimidiatus — with the red fur more or less entirely replaced with black
- B. f. flavifrons

== Ecology ==
The queen emerges from her hibernation at the end of March and often builds a nest in a disused mouse nest. The first workers appear about a month later. The nest declines at the end of August, and all the inhabitants die, except for the new queens, which hibernate in the earth. The bumblebee feeds on several flowering plants, most commonly those in Asteraceae, Fabaceae, Saxifragaceae, and Lamiaceae.

This species is host to the parasitic indiscriminate cuckoo bumblebee (Bombus insularis).

This bee occurs at high altitude and latitude, living in habitat such as tundra, taiga, and mountain forests and meadows.
