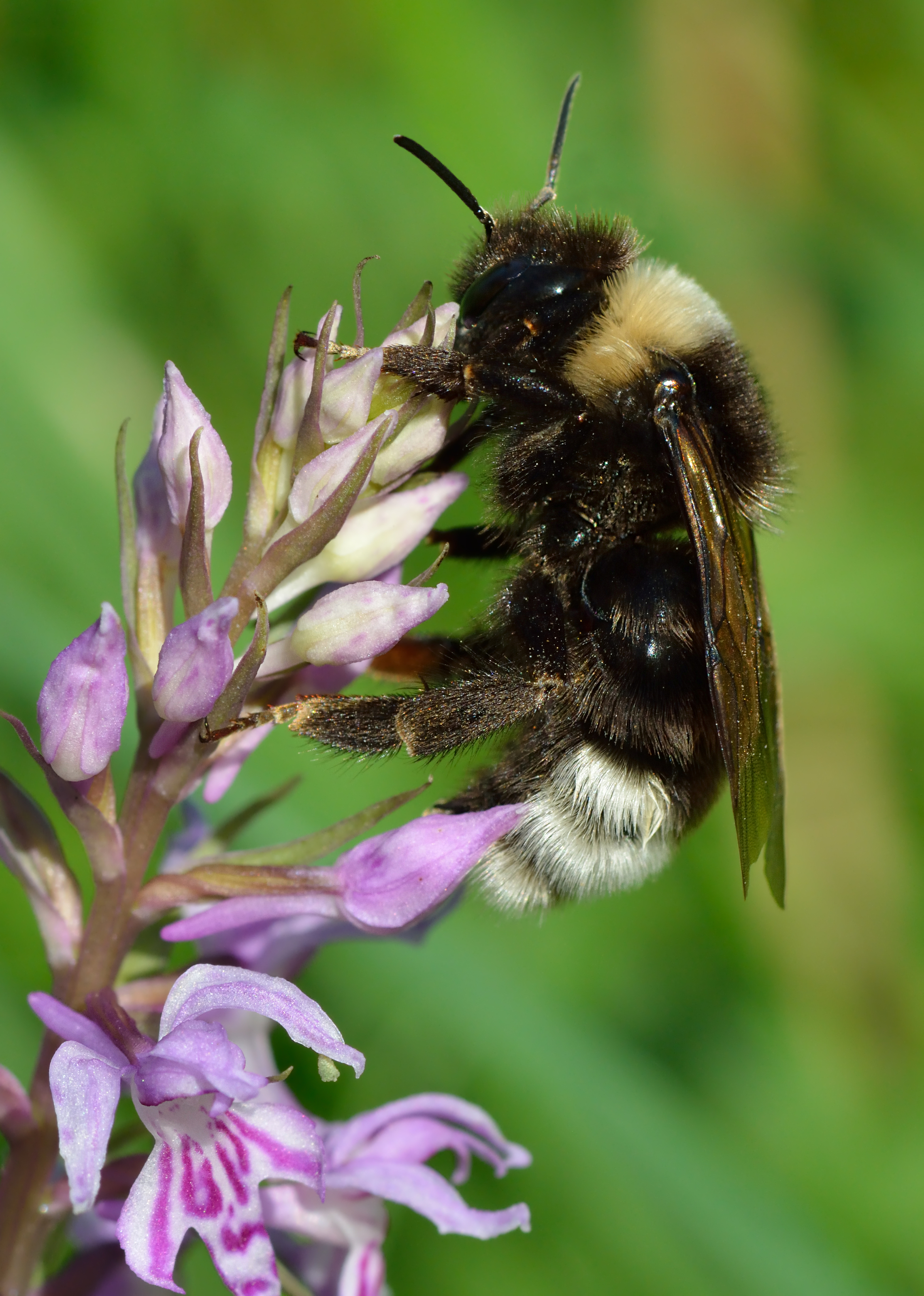
- Bombus bohemicus

Scientific classification
- Kingdom: Animalia
- Phylum: Arthropoda
- Clade: Pancrustacea
- Class: Insecta
- Order: Hymenoptera
- Family: Apidae
- Genus: Bombus
- Subgenus: Psithyrus

Species
- See text

= Psithyrus =

Bombus (Psithyrus)

Subgenus of bees

Cuckoo bumblebees are members of the subgenus Psithyrus in the bumblebee genus Bombus. Until the 1990s, Psithyrus was considered to constitute a separate genus. They are a specialized socially parasitic lineage which parasitises the nests of 'true' bumblebees; they do not collect pollen or establish their own nests. Cuckoo bumblebees do not create a worker caste and produce only male and female reproductives.

Cuckoo bumblebee females emerge from hibernation later than their host species to ensure that their host has had sufficient time to establish a nest. Before finding and invading a host colony, a Psithyrus female feeds directly from flowers until her ovaries are sufficiently developed, at which time she begins seeking a nest to invade. Once she has located and infiltrated a host colony, the Psithyrus female usurps the nest by killing or subduing the host queen. She then lays her own eggs, exploiting the host workers to feed her and her developing young through pheromones and/or physical attacks.

== Selected species ==
- Bombus ashtoni
- Bombus barbutellus
- Bombus bellardii
- Bombus bohemicus
- Bombus branickii
- Bombus campestris
- Bombus chinensis
- Bombus citrinus
- Bombus coreanus
- Bombus cornutus
- Bombus expolitus
- Bombus fernaldae
- Bombus ferganicus
- Bombus flavidus
- Bombus insularis
- Bombus morawitzianus
- Bombus norvegicus
- Bombus quadricolor
- Bombus rupestris
- Bombus skorikovi
- Bombus suckleyi
- Bombus sylvestris
- Bombus tibetanus
- Bombus turneri
- Bombus variabilis
- Bombus vestalis

== Gallery ==
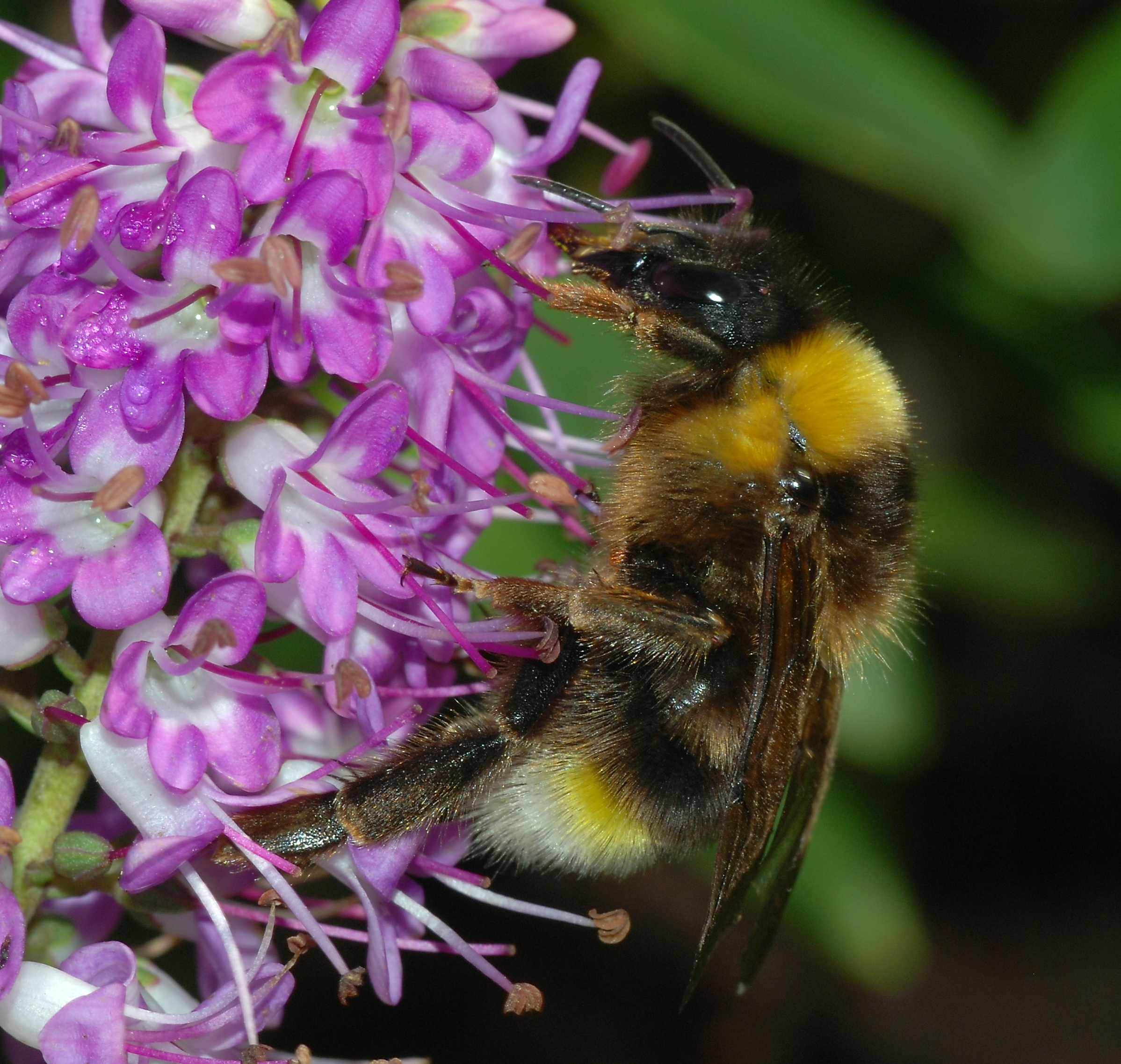
Bombus vestalis

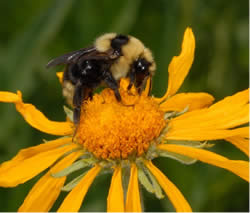
Bombus insularis

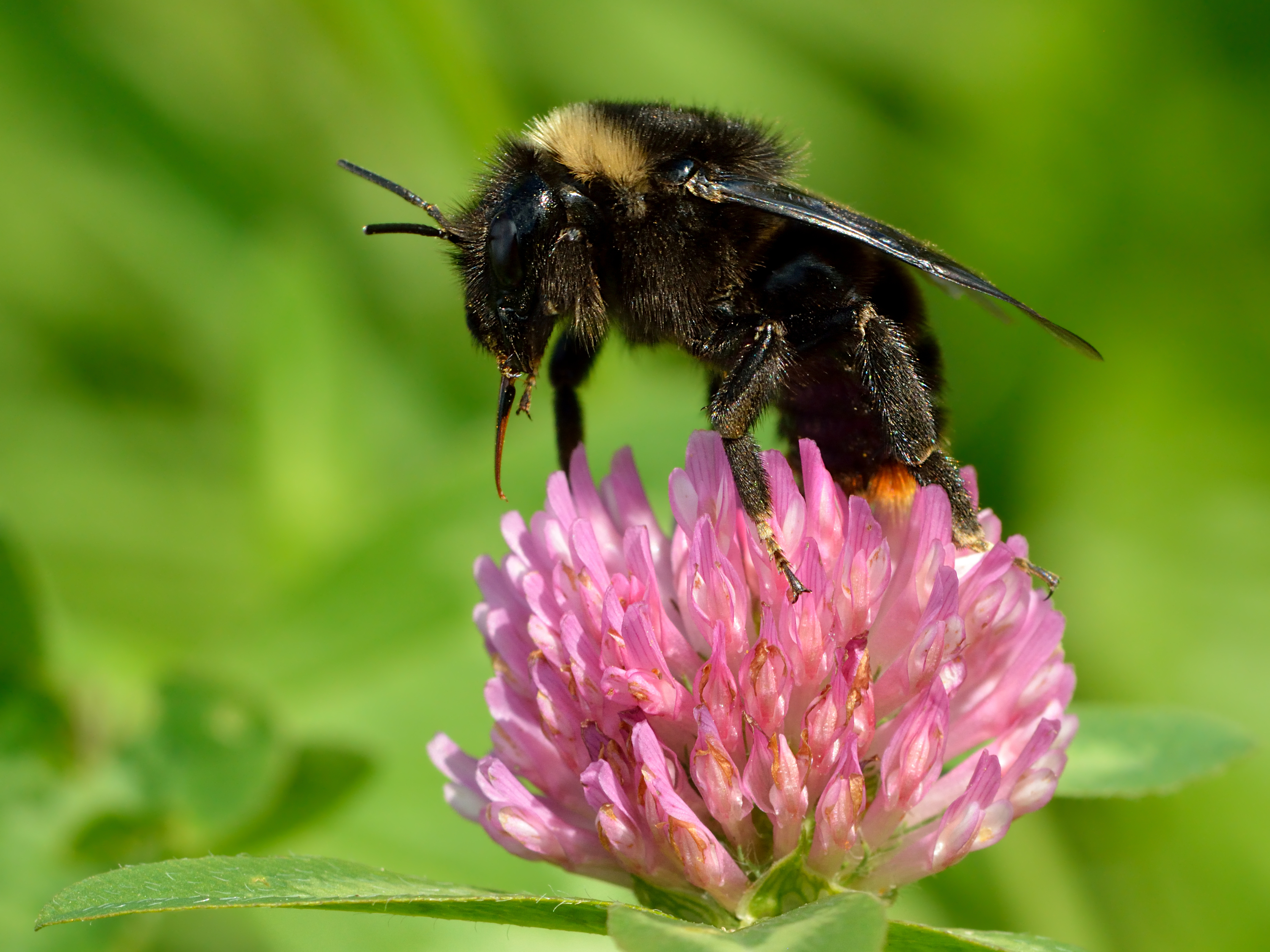
Bombus rupestris

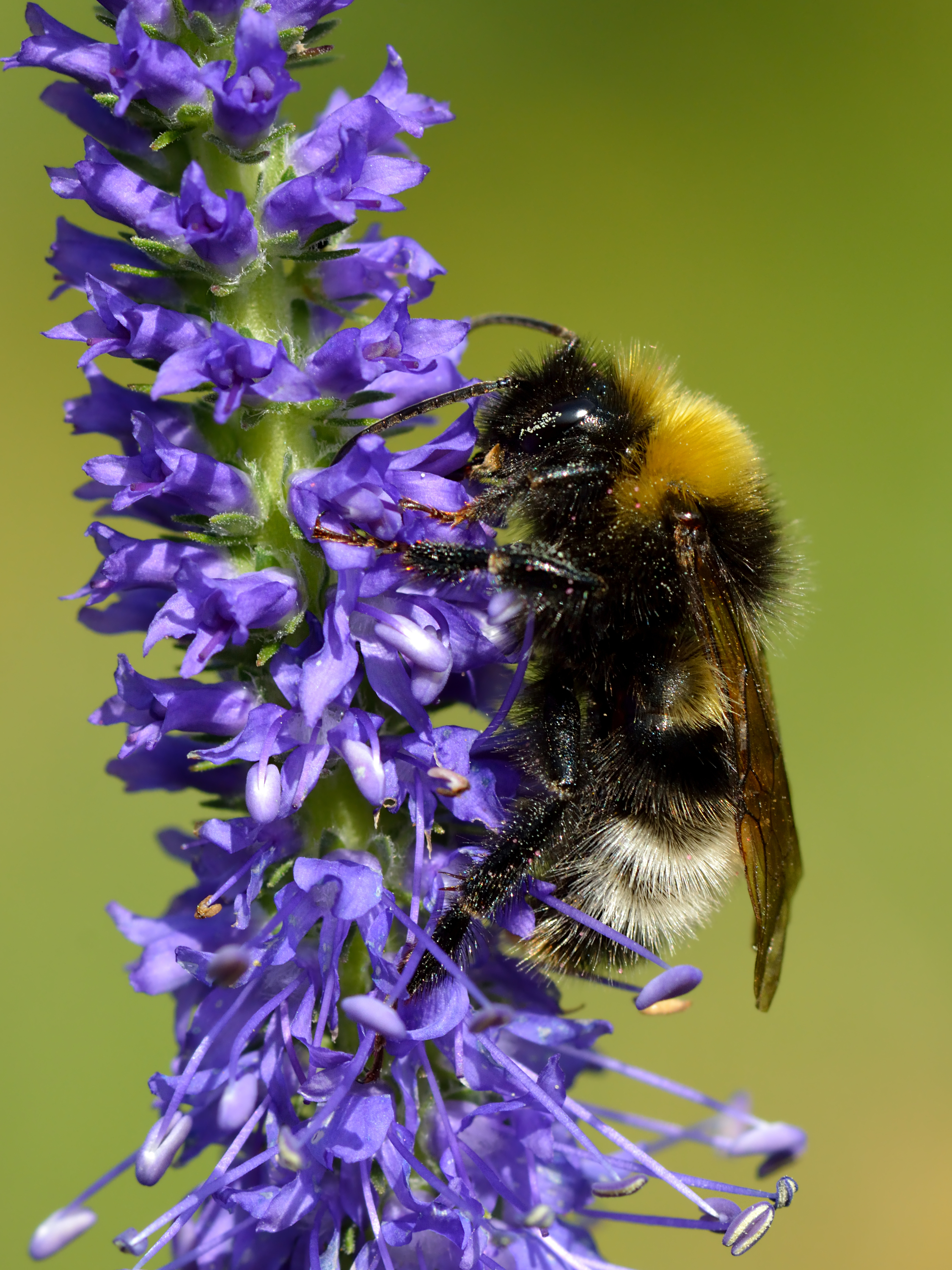
Bombus norvegicus

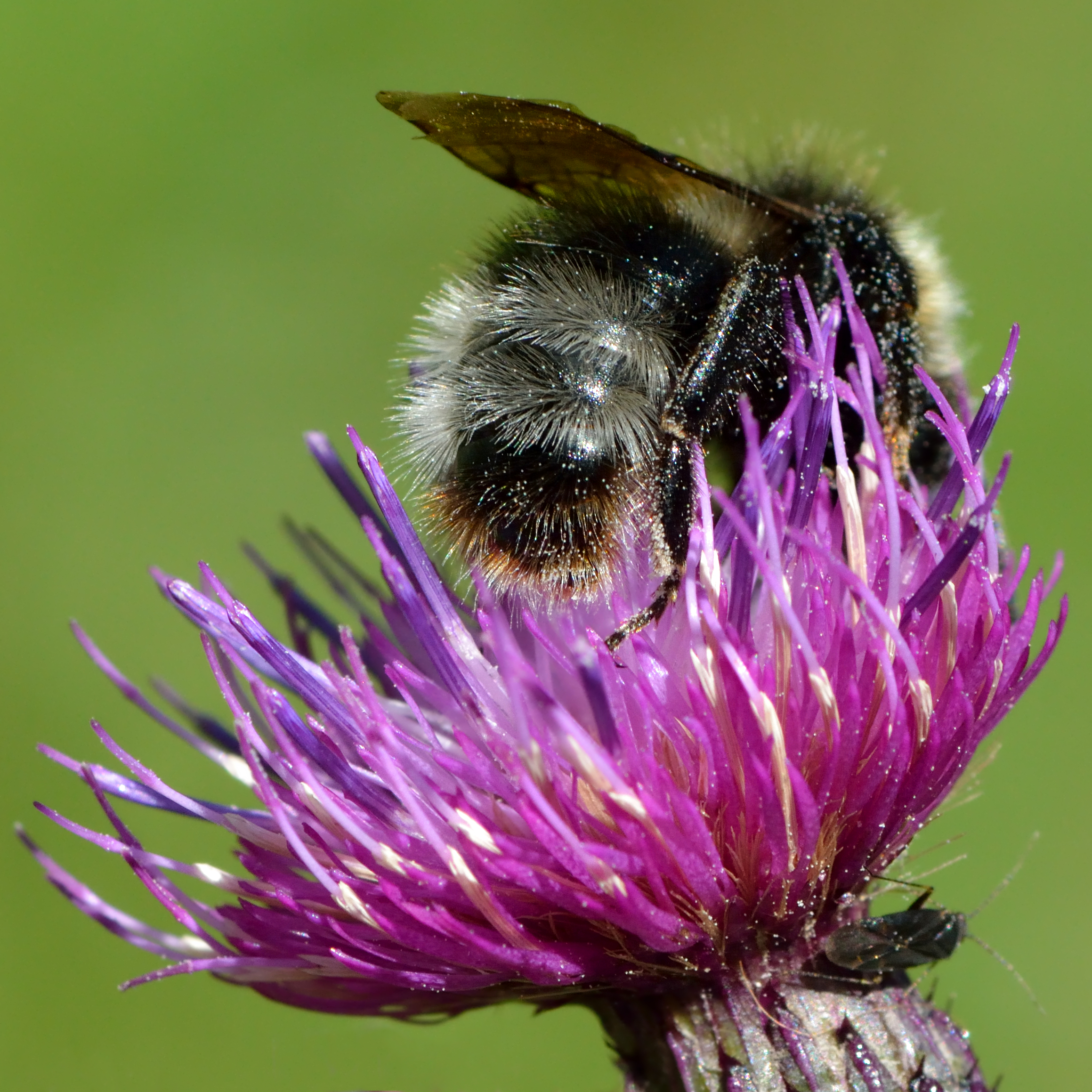
Bombus sylvestris
