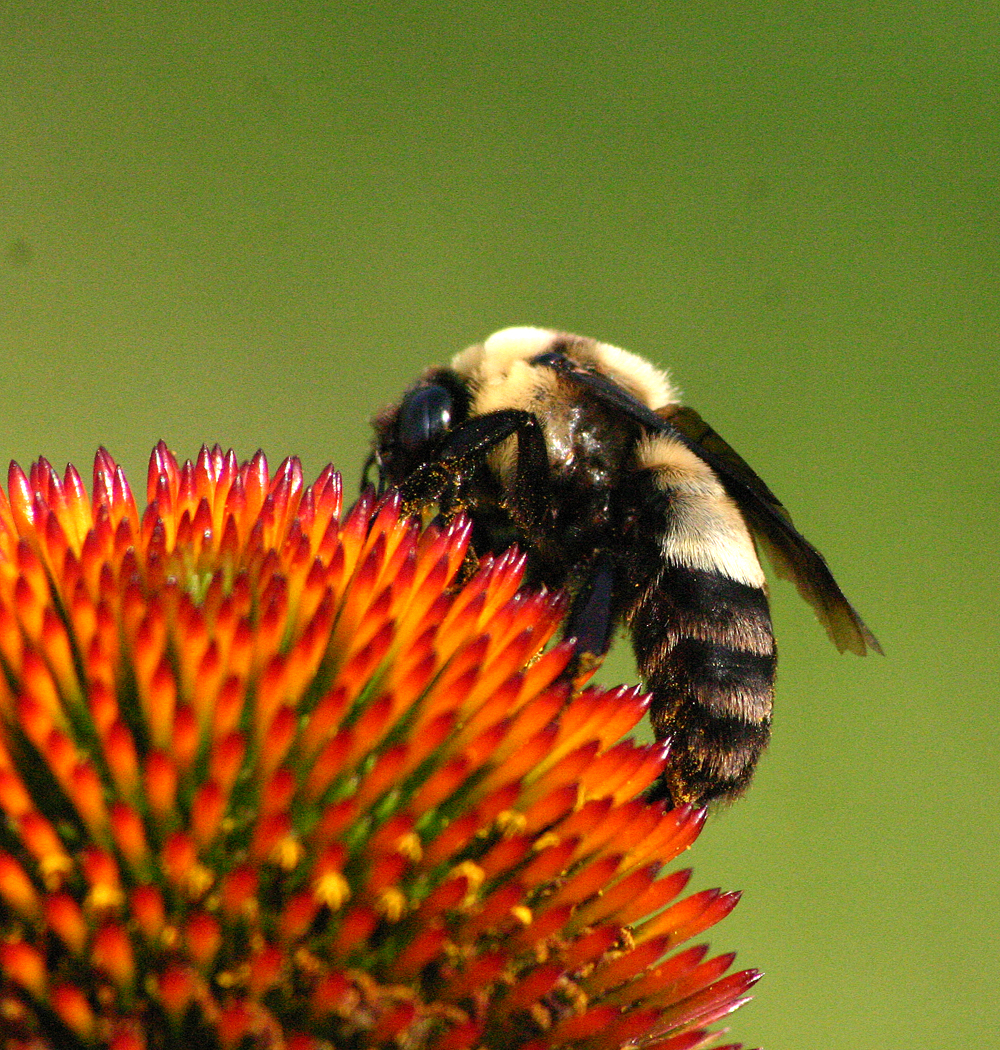

Conservation status
- Endangered (IUCN 3.1)

Scientific classification
- Domain: Eukaryota
- Kingdom: Animalia
- Phylum: Arthropoda
- Class: Insecta
- Order: Hymenoptera
- Family: Apidae
- Genus: Bombus
- Subgenus: Cullumanobombus
- Species: B. fraternus

Binomial name
- Bombus fraternus (Smith, 1854)

= Bombus fraternus =

Species of bee

Bombus fraternus is an endangered species of bumblebee known commonly as the Southern Plains bumblebee. It is native to the United States east of the Rocky Mountains. It is most often encountered in the southern Great Plains and along the Gulf Coastal Plain. This species has been found as far north as New Jersey and North Dakota, and as far south as Florida along the Gulf Coastal Plain into the state of Chihuahua in Mexico. This species was uncommon historically, but having faced declines in population; its estimated abundance is less than 15% of historical numbers.

== Taxonomy ==
Bumblebees are members of the genus Bombus within the insect order Hymenoptera and family Apidae. Bombus fraternus was first described by Frederick Smith in 1854. The southern plains bumble bee is classified under the subgenus Cullumanobombus.

== Description ==
The southern plains bumblebee is mostly black, with yellow bands across the thorax and abdomen that distinguish it from other bumblebees. This species is large in comparison to other bumblebees and is unusual among bumblebees because the hairs of the abdomen appear flattened rather than fluffy like most other bumblebees. Queens range in size from 0.97 to 1.07 inches (25-27 mm) while workers range in size from 0.56 to 0.75 inches (15-19 mm). Queens and workers have very similar coloration. The female bee’s body is covered in short yellow and black hairs with distinctive flattened, black hairs on the third tergal segment. Hairs on the face and sides of the thorax are usually black. Metasoma (upper side of abdomen) is nearly rectangular and slightly flattened with yellow hairs on the first and second tergal segments but the third tergal segment is entirely black. Males are also large, ranging in size from 0.85-1.00 inches (22-25 mm) with eyes much larger than females and with long antennae. Antennae segments are nearly three times the length of the base of the antennae called the scape. Coloration pattern for males is very similar to females with the area between the wings sometimes extensively yellow.

== Habitat ==
The southern plains bumble bee can be found in the open prairies, meadows, and grasslands of the southeastern coastal plain and throughout the Great Plains from Texas to North Dakota. This species is a foraging generalist having recorded floral associations with flowering plants from at least 20 plant families. Example food plants for the southern plains bumble bee are Asclepias, Bidens, blanket flower, bush clover, Cassia, Eryngium, Hypericum, Liatris, Melilotus, Monarda, Padus, Ratibida, Solidago, and Vaccinium. The southern plains bumble bee is adaptable within open natural and human modified habitats and can be found in intact prairie, within agricultural land, and in urbanized habitat. The southern plains bumble bee occurs in urbanized areas that have suitable floral and nesting resources. It has been recently found in the vicinity of St. Louis, both at an urban farm and at a restoration prairie.

The southern plains bumble bee nests underground. In general, bumble bees are opportunistic nesters that do not dig their own underground nests, but take advantage of pre-existing holes and depressions below the surface formed by rodents or other animals or cavities above the surface created by old logs, stumps, old ground-nesting bird nests, or clumps of grass.

Mated females also require sites where they can hibernate during the winter after mating. The specific requirements of overwintering sites of this species are not yet known, but overwintering sites are distinct from colony nesting sites and may or may not be near foraging areas. Bumble bees are generally known to hibernate close to the ground surface or down an inch or two in loose soil, or under leaf litter or other debris, in sites that are undisturbed and have adequate organic material to provide shelter.

== Distribution ==
The southern plains bumble bee was historically found across the southern and central Great Plains and along the southeastern coastal plain. The southern plains bumble bee has been observed in 27 states. The bee was rarely observed in the northernmost part of its range in North Dakota and Michigan. This species was not considered ever present in Wisconsin. The species has a small number of records from the Mexican state of Chihuahua, but none within the past decade. There are no known records from Canada.
