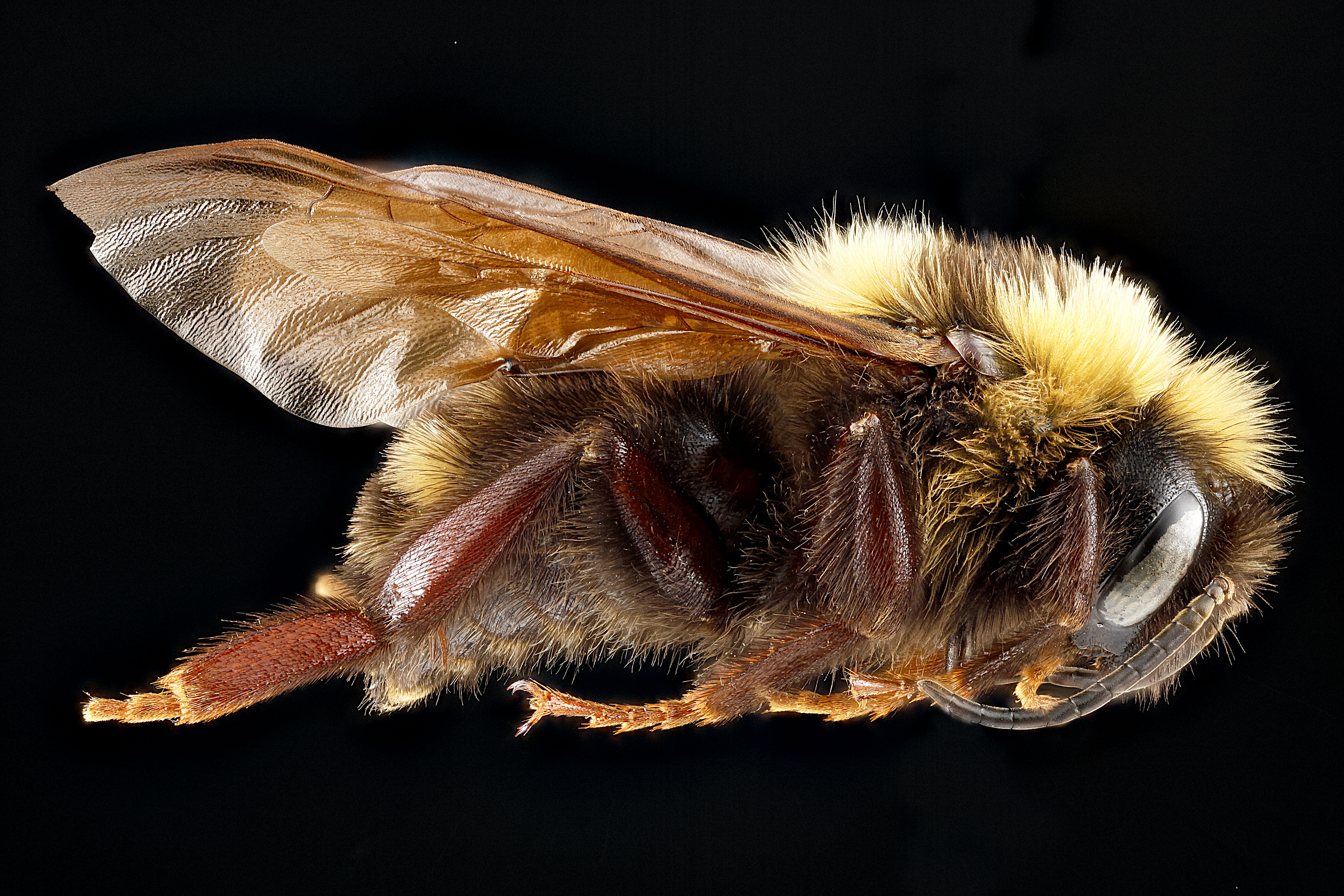
- Male

Conservation status
- Critically Endangered (IUCN 3.1)

Scientific classification
- Kingdom: Animalia
- Phylum: Arthropoda
- Clade: Pancrustacea
- Class: Insecta
- Order: Hymenoptera
- Family: Apidae
- Genus: Bombus
- Subgenus: Psithyrus
- Species: B. variabilis

Binomial name
- Bombus variabilis (Cresson, 1872)

= Bombus variabilis =

Species of bee

Bombus variabilis is a critically endangered species of cuckoo bumblebee that occurs in North America. It has not been observed in the United States in at least 20 years and is potentially extirpated or extinct.

Bombus variabilis is a parasitic species. Females kill and replace the queens of B. pensylvanicus, taking over their nests in the process. The decline of the latter as hosts can partially be linked to the decline of B. variabilis. This species of bee can be distinguished by the lack of pollen baskets. The bee features have a dark face with yellow hair in its vertex and with dark brown wings. Its thorax has variations between black spots or patches. For females, they only have black abdomens but males can vary in their hair color patterns.
