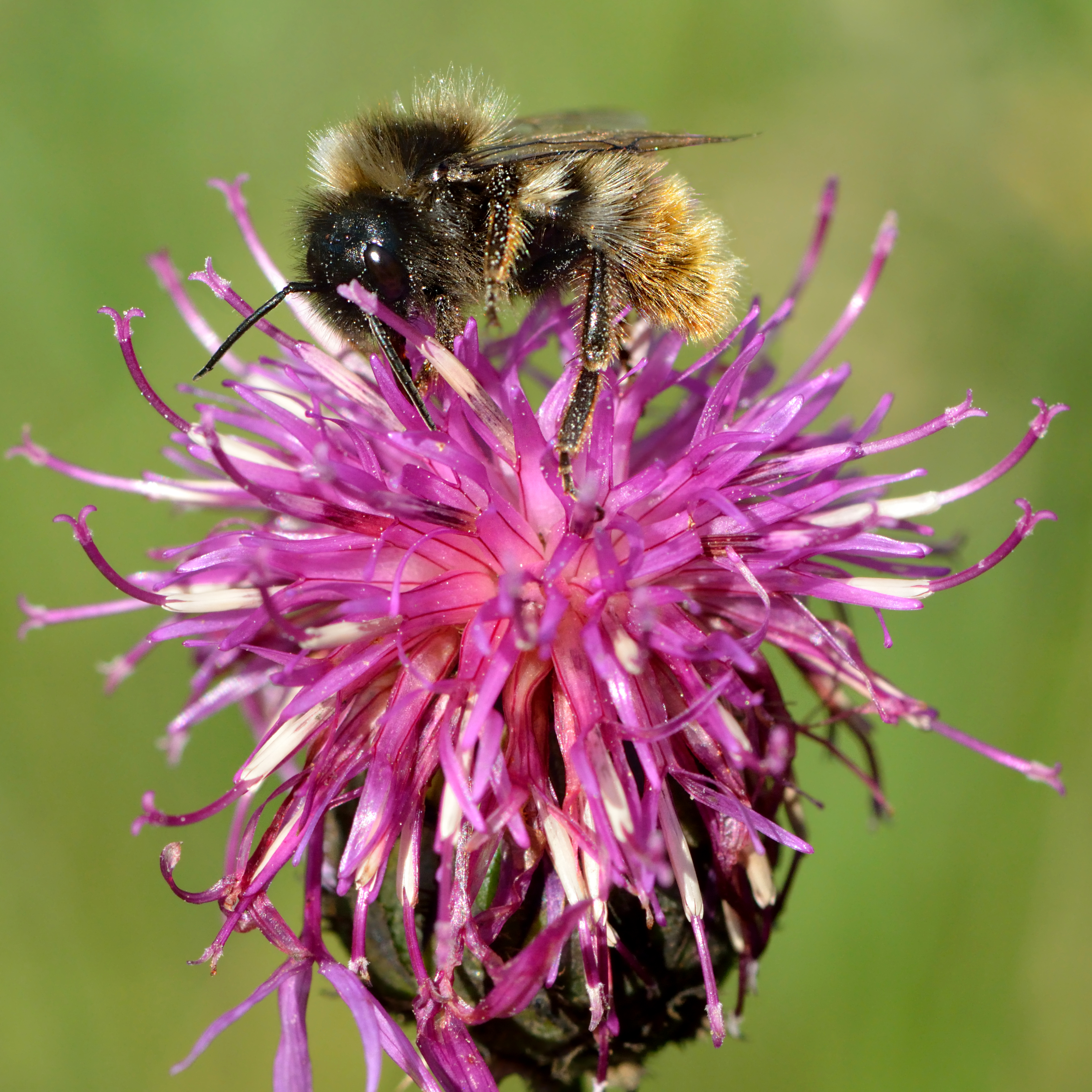
- Male
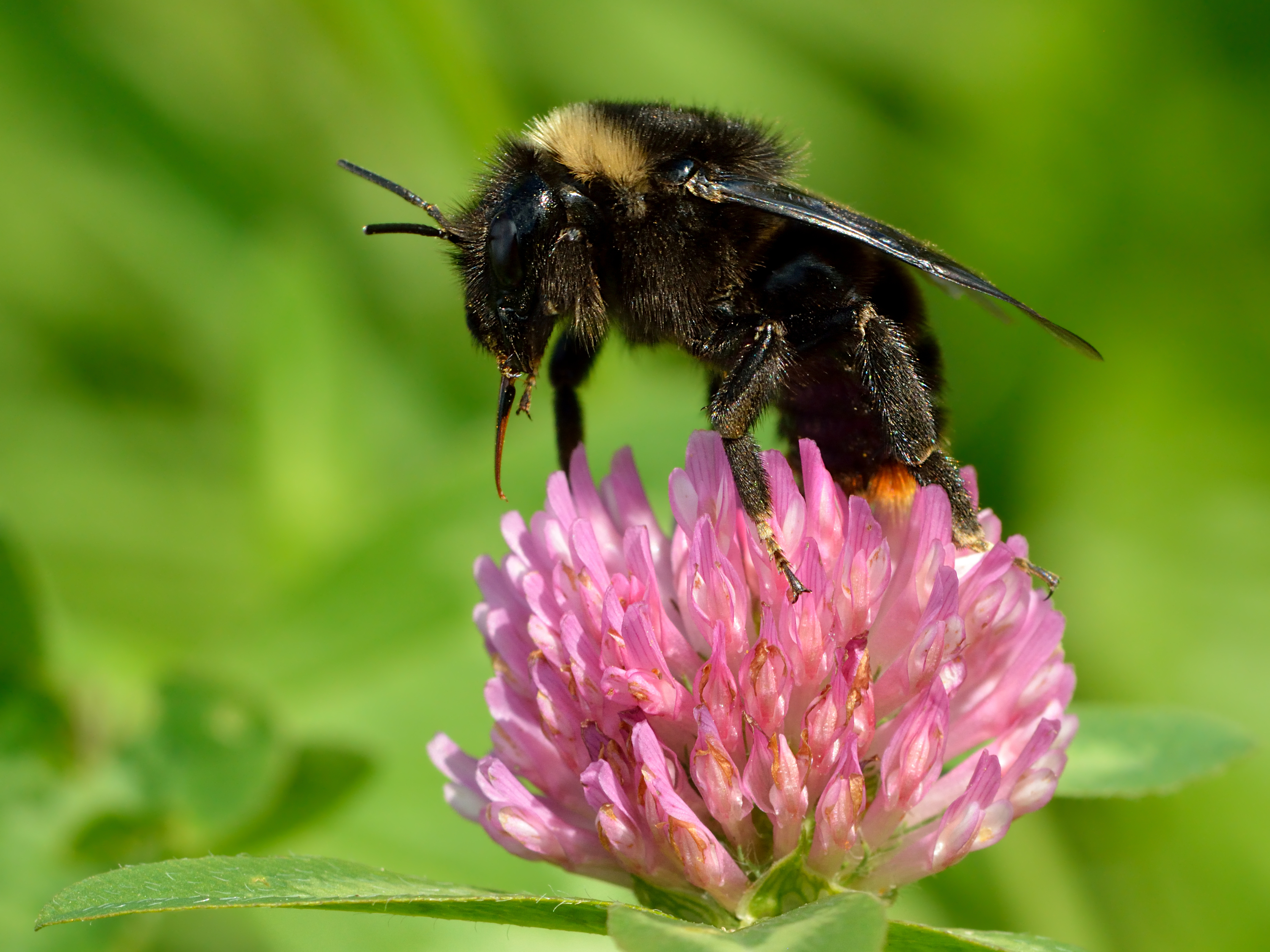
- Female

Scientific classification
- Kingdom: Animalia
- Phylum: Arthropoda
- Class: Insecta
- Order: Hymenoptera
- Family: Apidae
- Genus: Bombus
- Subgenus: Psithyrus
- Species: B. rupestris

Binomial name
- Bombus rupestris (Fabricius, 1793)

Synonyms
- Apathus rupestris (Fabricius, 1793); Apis albinella Kirby, 1802; Apis arenaris Panzer, 1801; Apis frutetorum Panzer, 1801; Apis rupestris Fabricius, 1793; Bombus obscurus Seidl, 1838; Bombus rupestris orientanus Reinig, 1931; Bombus rupestris siculus Reinig, 1931; Psithyrus rupestris (Fabricius, 1793)

= Bombus rupestris =

Species of bee

Bombus rupestris is a species of cuckoo bumblebee present in most of Europe except Iceland. In the Balkans it is found in montane and alpine habitats northwards from Central Greece. It is also found in Turkey.

== Description ==
The female is much larger than the male; she has a length of 20–25 mm (0.79–0.98 in), while the drone usually is not more than 16 mm (0.63 in). The bumblebee is black, with the last abdominal segments coloured orange-red.

Due to its parasitic lifestyle, no workers exist.

== Behaviour ==
Bombus rupestris is found in flower-rich habitats, such as meadows and along hedgerows. The bumblebee parasitizes the nests of the red-tailed bumblebee, B. lapidarius.
