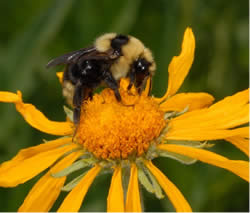

Conservation status
- Least Concern (IUCN 3.1)

Scientific classification
- Domain: Eukaryota
- Kingdom: Animalia
- Phylum: Arthropoda
- Class: Insecta
- Order: Hymenoptera
- Family: Apidae
- Genus: Bombus
- Subgenus: Psithyrus
- Species: B. insularis

Binomial name
- Bombus insularis (Smith, 1861)

Synonyms
- Apathus insularis; Bombus bicolor; Bombus consultus; Bombus crawfordi; Bombus interruptus

= Bombus insularis =

Species of bee

Bombus insularis is a species of bumblebee in the subgenus Psithyrus, the cuckoo bumblebees. It is native to northern and western North America, where it occurs throughout Canada, Alaska, the northern United States, and some western states. It is known commonly as the indiscriminate cuckoo bumblebee.

The female of the species is 1.6 to 1.9 centimeters long and just under a centimeter wide. The head is black with tufts of yellow hairs and the thorax is coated in long pale yellow hairs. The legs are hairy black. The abdomen has is black with yellow along the sides. The male is smaller, about half a centimeter wide at the abdomen. The head has long black hairs with small patches of yellow and the abdomen has strips of yellow and black hairs.

This species lives in tundra and taiga, western mountain ranges, and some maritime regions.

As in other cuckoo bees, the queen of this species enters the nest of a host species, kills the resident queen, and lives and breeds in the nest tended by the host workers. Host species of this bee include the white-shouldered bumblebee (B. appositus), yellow bumblebee (B. fervidus), yellow-fronted bumblebee (B. flavifrons), Nevada bumblebee (B. nevadensis), and orange-belted bumblebee (B. ternarius).

This bee is still common and widespread, though it has declined in some areas and disappeared from a few parts of its historical range. Some of its host species have faced more significant declines. Potential threats include habitat loss, pesticides, pathogens from domesticated pollinators, competition from introduced bees, and climate change.
