= List of bumblebee species =

Genus of bees

The list presented here is a list of global bumblebee species (Tribe Bombini) based on the Bombus phylogeny presented by Cameron et al (2007) and grouped by subgenus following the revision of Williams et al (2008). The bumblebee fossil record extends back to the Late Eocene in North America and England with the most diversity of fossils found during the Miocene. The fossil species were discussed and revised by Dehon et al (2019).

== Subgenus Alpigenobombus ==
Name	Taxon name	Distribution	ITIS TSN	Image
Bombus angustus	Bombus angustus Chu, 1949	Taiwan	1130323	
Bombus breviceps	Bombus breviceps Smith, 1852	East Asia, South Asia, Southeast Asia	714879	
Bombus genalis	Bombus genalis Friese, 1918	Himalayas	714913	
Bombus grahami	Bombus grahami Frison, 1933	South Asia, East Asia	714915	
Bombus kashmirensis	Bombus kashmirensis Friese, 1909	East Asia, South Asia	714936	
Bombus nobilis	Bombus nobilis Friese, 1905	South Asia, East Asia	714967	
Bombus wurflenii	Bombus wurflenii Radoszkowski, 1860	Europe	715043	

== Subgenus Alpinobombus ==
Name	Taxon name	Distribution	ITIS TSN	Image
Bombus alpinus	Bombus alpinus Linnaeus, 1758	Europe	714857	
Bombus balteatus	Bombus balteatus Dahlbom, 1832	North America, Europe	714786	
Bombus hyperboreus	Bombus hyperboreus Schönherr, 1809	Canada, Greenland, Russia, Scandinavia	714811	
Bombus kirbiellus	Bombus kirbiellus Curtis, 1835	United States, Canada	1128121	
Bombus kluanensis	Bombus kluanensis Williams, Cannings, 2016	North America	1129722	
High Arctic Bumble Bee	Bombus natvigi Richards, 1931	Canada, Alaska	1129726	
Bombus neoboreus	Bombus neoboreus Sladen, 1919	Canada, Alaska	714825	
Bombus polaris	Bombus polaris Curtis, 1835	Arctic	714831	
Bombus pyrrhopygus	Bombus pyrrhopygus Friese, 1902	Europe, North Asia	1129727	

== Subgenus Bombias ==
Name	Taxon name	Distribution	ITIS TSN	Image
Black and gold bumblebee	Bombus auricomus (Robertson, 1903)	Michigan	714785	
Bombus confusus	Bombus confusus Schenck, 1859	Luxembourg	714886	
Nevada bumble bee	Bombus nevadensis Cresson, 1874	North America	714826	

== Subgenus Bombus (sensu stricto) ==
Name	Taxon name	Distribution	ITIS TSN	Image
Rusty patched bumble bee	Bombus affinis Cresson, 1863	Michigan	714782	
Bombus bicoloratus	Bombus bicoloratus Smith, 1879		714873	
Cryptic bumblebee	Bombus cryptarum Fabricius, 1775	Luxembourg	1126452	
Franklin's bumblebee	Bombus franklini Frison, 1921		714804	
Short-tongued bumblebee	Bombus hypocrita Perez, 1905		714927	
Bombus ignitus	Bombus ignitus Smith, 1869		714928	
Bombus jacobsoni	Bombus jacobsoni Skorikov, 1912		1126453	
Bombus lantschouensis	Bombus lantschouensis Vogt, 1908		1126454	
Bombus longipennis	Bombus longipennis Friese, 1918		1126455	
White-tailed bumblebee	Bombus lucorum Linnaeus, 1761	Luxembourg	714816	
Northern white-tailed bumblebee	Bombus magnus Vogt, 1911		1126456	
Bombus minshanicus	Bombus minshanicus Bischoff, 1936		1126457	
Western bumble bee	Bombus occidentalis Greene, 1858		714827	
Bombus patagiatus	Bombus patagiatus Nylander, 1848		714977	
Bombus sporadicus	Bombus sporadicus Nylander, 1848		715016	
Bombus terrestris	Bombus terrestris Linnaeus, 1758	Morocco, Lebanon, Luxembourg	714842	
Yellow-banded bumble bee	Bombus terricola Kirby, 1837	Michigan	714843	
Bombus tunicatus	Bombus tunicatus Smith, 1852		715033	

== Subgenus Cullumanobombus ==
Name	Taxon name	Distribution	ITIS TSN	Image
Bombus baeri	Bombus baeri Vachal, 1904		714868	
Bombus brachycephalus	Bombus brachycephalus Handlirsch, 1888		714790	
Scarlet-tailed bumble bee	Bombus coccineus Friese, 1903	Peru	714885	
Crotch's bumble bee	Bombus crotchii Cresson, 1878		714796	
Cullum's bumblebee	Bombus cullumanus Kirby, 1802		714891	
Bombus ecuadorius	Bombus ecuadorius Meunier, 1890		714897	
Southern Plains bumblebee	Bombus fraternus Smith, 1854	Michigan	714805	
Mourning bee	Bombus funebris Smith, 1854		714911	
Brown-belted bumblebee	Bombus griseocollis Geer, 1773	Michigan	714807	
Bombus handlirschi	Bombus handlirschi Friese, 1903		714918	
Bombus haueri	Bombus haueri Handlirsch, 1888		714809	
Bombus hortulanus	Bombus hortulanus Friese, 1904		714924	
Bombus macgregori	Bombus macgregori Labougle, Ayala, 1985		714817	
Bombus melaleucus	Bombus melaleucus Handlirsch, 1888		714819	
Morrison bumblebee	Bombus morrisoni Cresson, 1878		714823	
Bombus pristinus	Bombus pristinus Unger, 1867			
Bombus randeckensis	Bombus randeckensis Wappler, Engel, 2012			
Bombus robustus	Bombus robustus Smith, 1854		714993	
Bombus rohweri	Bombus rohweri Frison, 1925		714994	
Bombus rubicundus	Bombus rubicundus Smith, 1854		714996	
Red-belted bumblebee	Bombus rufocinctus Cresson, 1863	Michigan	714833	
Bombus semenoviellus	Bombus semenoviellus Skorikov, 1910		715007	
Bombus trophonius	Bombus trophonius Prokop, Dehon, Michez, Engel, 2017			
Bombus tucumanus	Bombus tucumanus Vachal, 1904		715032	
Bombus unicus	Bombus unicus Morawitz, 1883		715036	
Bombus vogti	Bombus vogti Friese, 1903		715041	

== Subgenus Kallobombus ==
Name	Taxon name	Distribution	ITIS TSN	Image
Broken-belted bumblebee	Bombus soroeensis Fabricius, 1777	Luxembourg	715015	

== Subgenus Megabombus ==
Name	Taxon name	Distribution	ITIS TSN	Image
Bombus argillaceus	Bombus argillaceus Scopoli, 1763	Lebanon	714861	
Bombus bicoloratus	Bombus bicoloratus Smith, 1879		714873	
Bombus consobrinus	Bombus consobrinus Dahlbom, 1832		714887	
Bombus czerskii	Bombus czerskii Skorikov, 1910		714892	
Bombus diversus	Bombus diversus Smith, 1869		714896	
Bombus gerstaeckeri	Bombus gerstaeckeri Morawitz, 1881		714914	
Bombus hortorum	Bombus hortorum Linnaeus, 1761	Luxembourg	714923	
Bombus irisanensis	Bombus irisanensis Cockerell, 1910		714935	
Bombus koreanus	Bombus koreanus (Skorikov, 1933)		714938	
Bombus longipes	Bombus longipes Friese, 1905		714946	
Bombus melanopoda	Bombus melanopoda Cockerell, 1910		714951	
Bombus portchinsky	Bombus portchinsky Radoszkowski, 1883		714983	
Bombus religiosus	Bombus religiosus (Frison, 1935)		714990	
Large garden bumblebee	Bombus ruderatus Fabricius, 1775	Morocco	714999	
Bombus saltuarius	Bombus saltuarius (Skorikov, 1931)		715003	
Bombus securus	Bombus securus (Frison, 1935)		715005	
Bombus senex	Bombus senex Vollenhoven, 1873		715008	
Bombus supremus	Bombus supremus Morawitz, 1887		715021	
Bombus sushkini	Bombus sushkini (Skorikov, 1931)		715022	
Bombus tichenkoi	Bombus tichenkoi (Skorikov, 1926)		715027	
Three-striped bumblebee	Bombus trifasciatus Smith, 1852		715030	
Bombus ussurensis	Bombus ussurensis Rsdoszkowski, 1877		715037	

== Subgenus Melanobombus ==
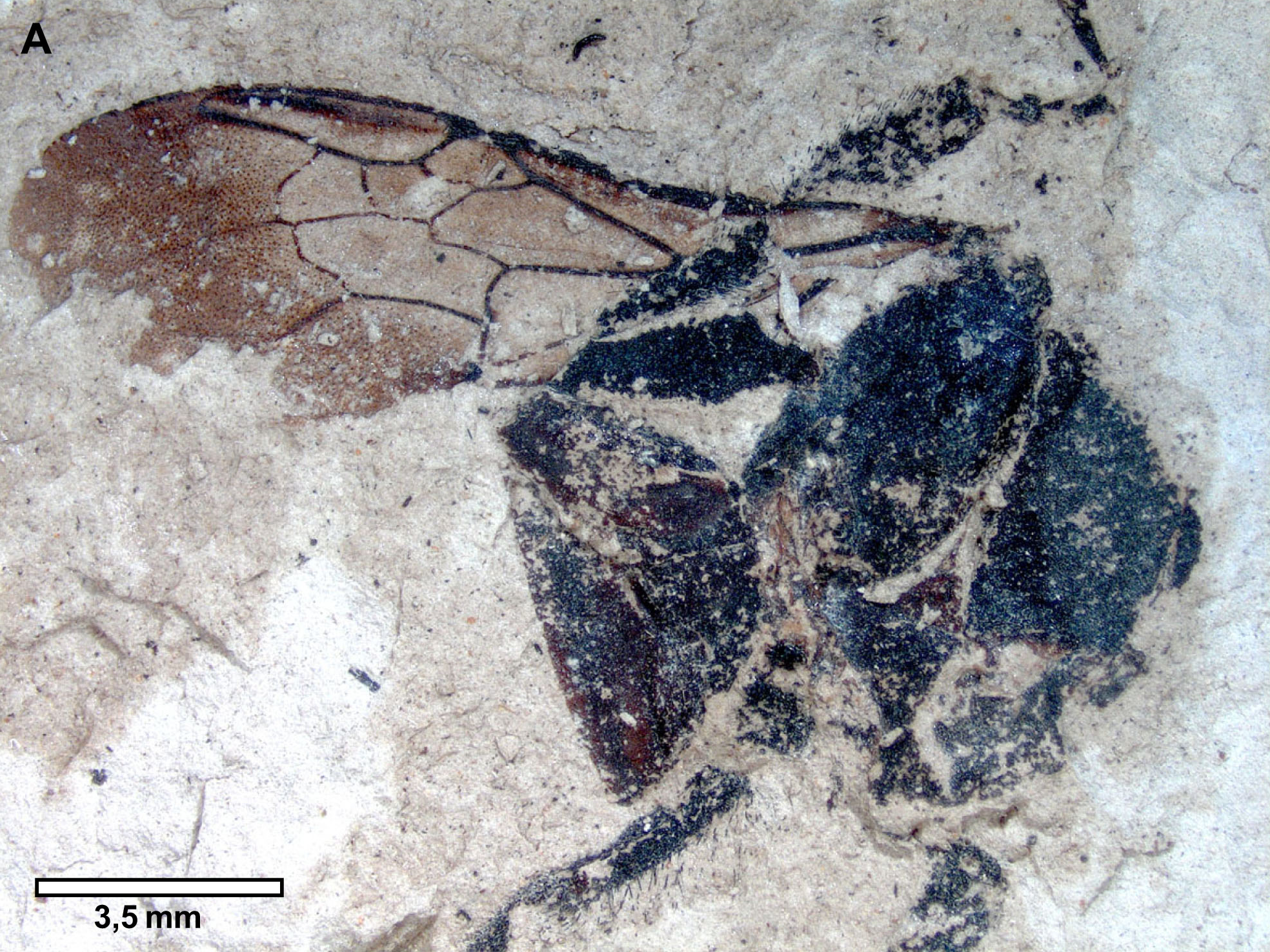
†Bombus cerdanyensis holotype

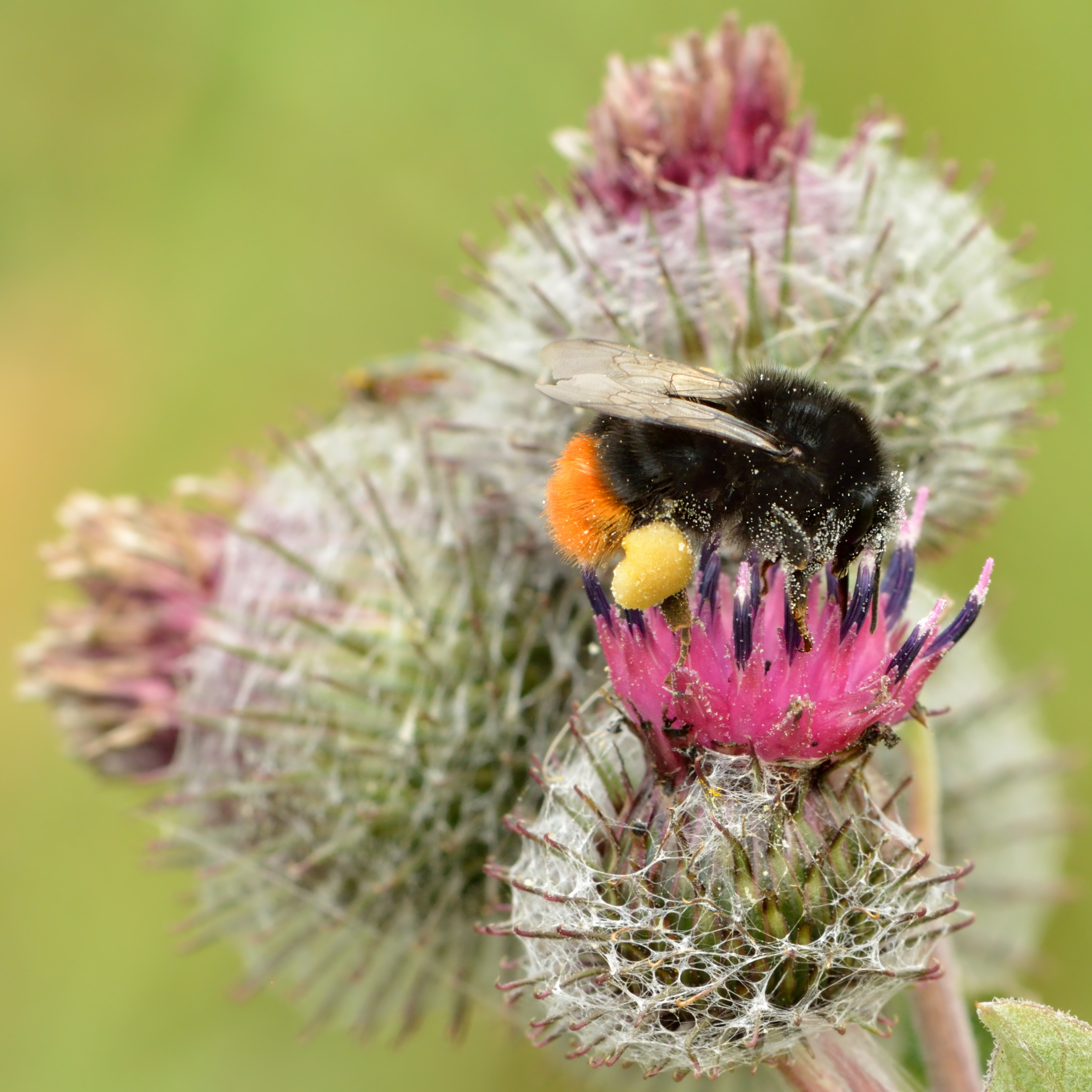
Bombus lapidarius

- Bombus alagesianus
- †Bombus cerdanyensis - Late Miocene, Bellver de Cerdanya, Spain
- Bombus erzurumensis
- Bombus eurythorax
- Bombus eximius
- Bombus festivus
- Bombus formosellus
- Bombus friseanus
- Bombus incertoides
- Bombus incertus
- Bombus keriensis
- Bombus ladakhensis
- Bombus lapidarius – red-tailed bumblebee
- Bombus miniatus
- Bombus prshewalskyi
- Bombus pyrosoma
- Bombus qilianensis
- Bombus richardsiellus
- Bombus rufipes
- Bombus rufofasciatus
- Bombus semenovianus
- Bombus sichelii
- Bombus simillimus
- Bombus tanguticus
- Bombus tibeticus

== Subgenus Mendacibombus ==
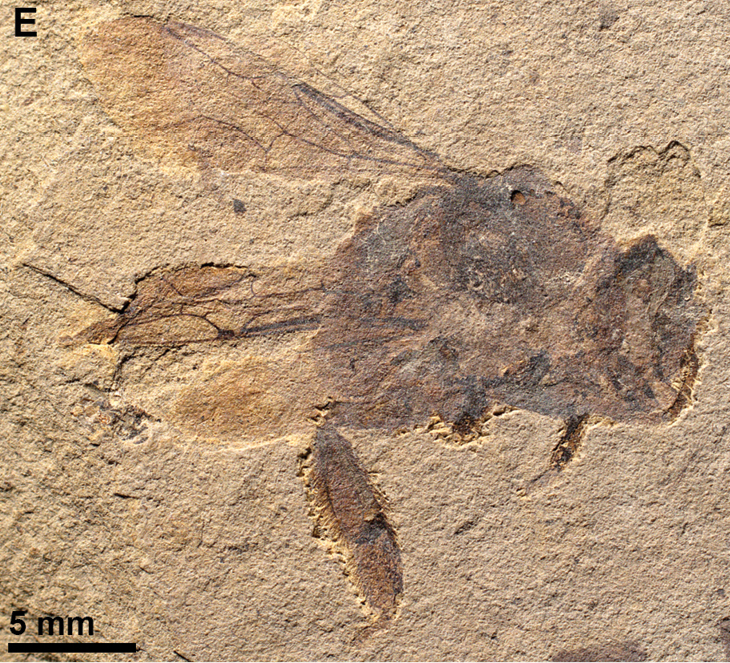
†Bombus beskonakensis fossil

- Bombus avinoviellus
- †Bombus beskonakensis (Miocene, Bes Konak paleolake, Turkey)
- Bombus convexus
- Bombus handlirschianus
- Bombus himalayanus
- Bombus makarjini
- Bombus margreiteri
- Bombus marussinus
- Bombus mendax
- Bombus superbus
- Bombus turkestanicus
- Bombus waltoni

== Subgenus Orientalibombus ==
- Bombus braccatus
- Bombus funerarius
- Bombus haemorrhoidalis

== Subgenus †Paraelectrobombus ==
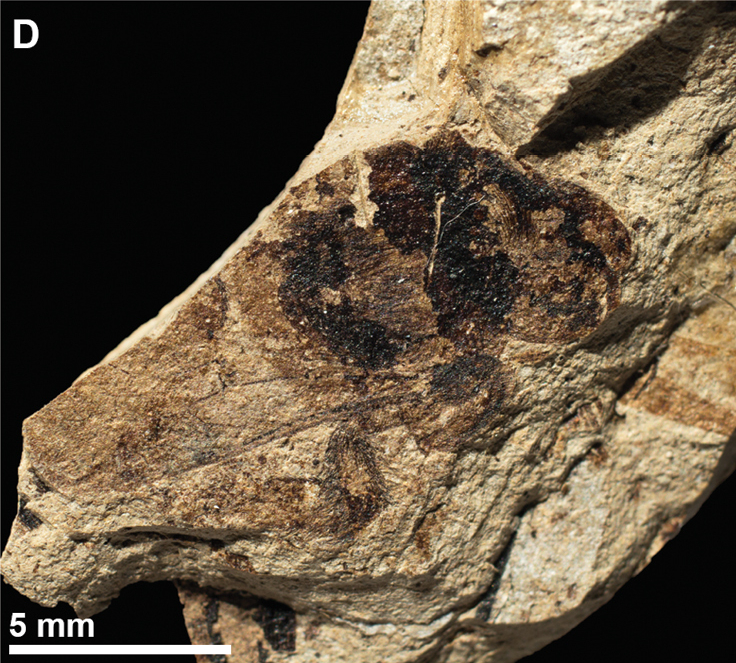
Bombus patriciae holotype

- †Bombus patriciae - Late Oligocene/Early Miocene, BesKonak paleolake, Ankara, Turkey

== Subgenus Psithyrus ==
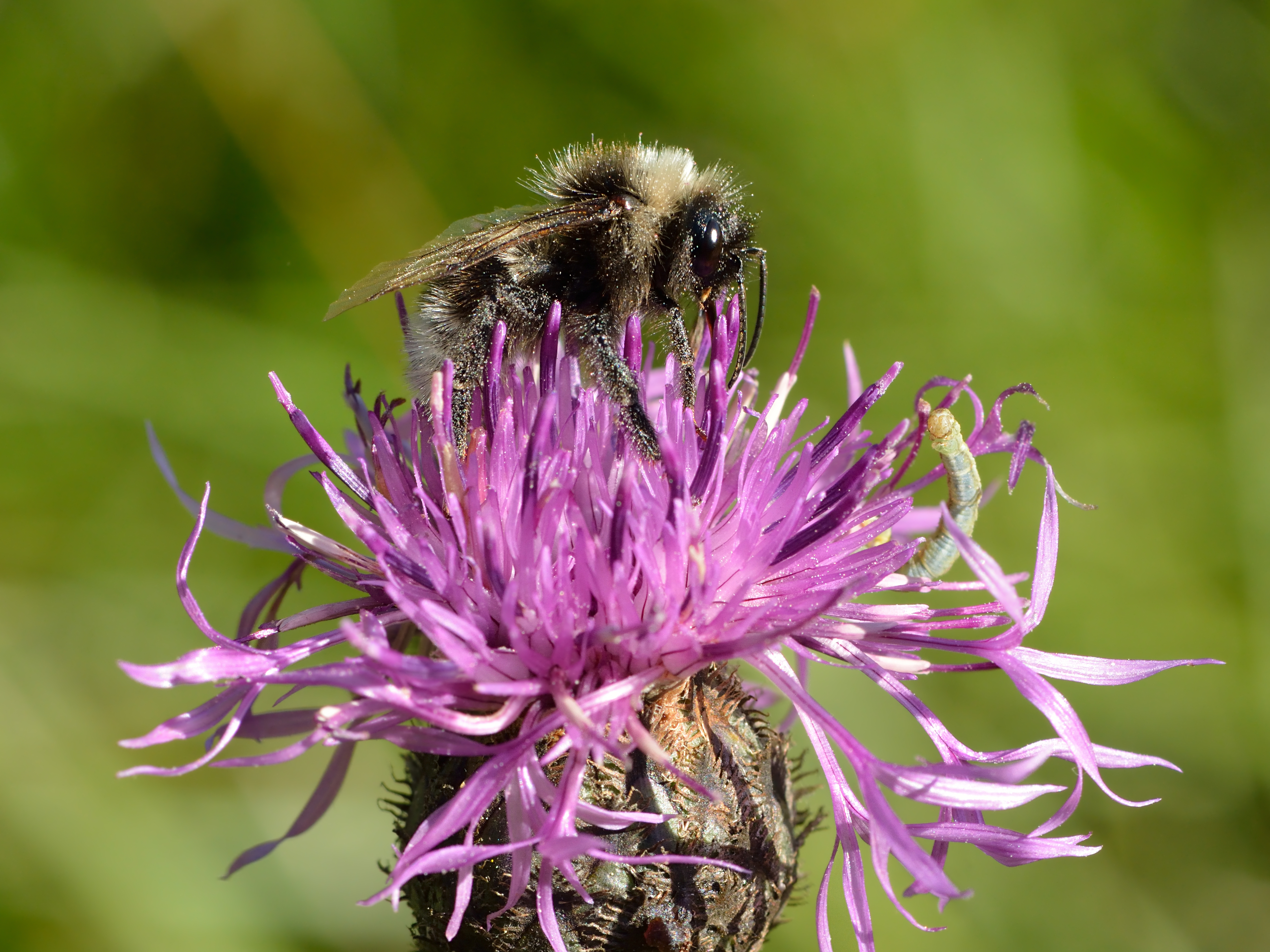
Bombus barbutellus

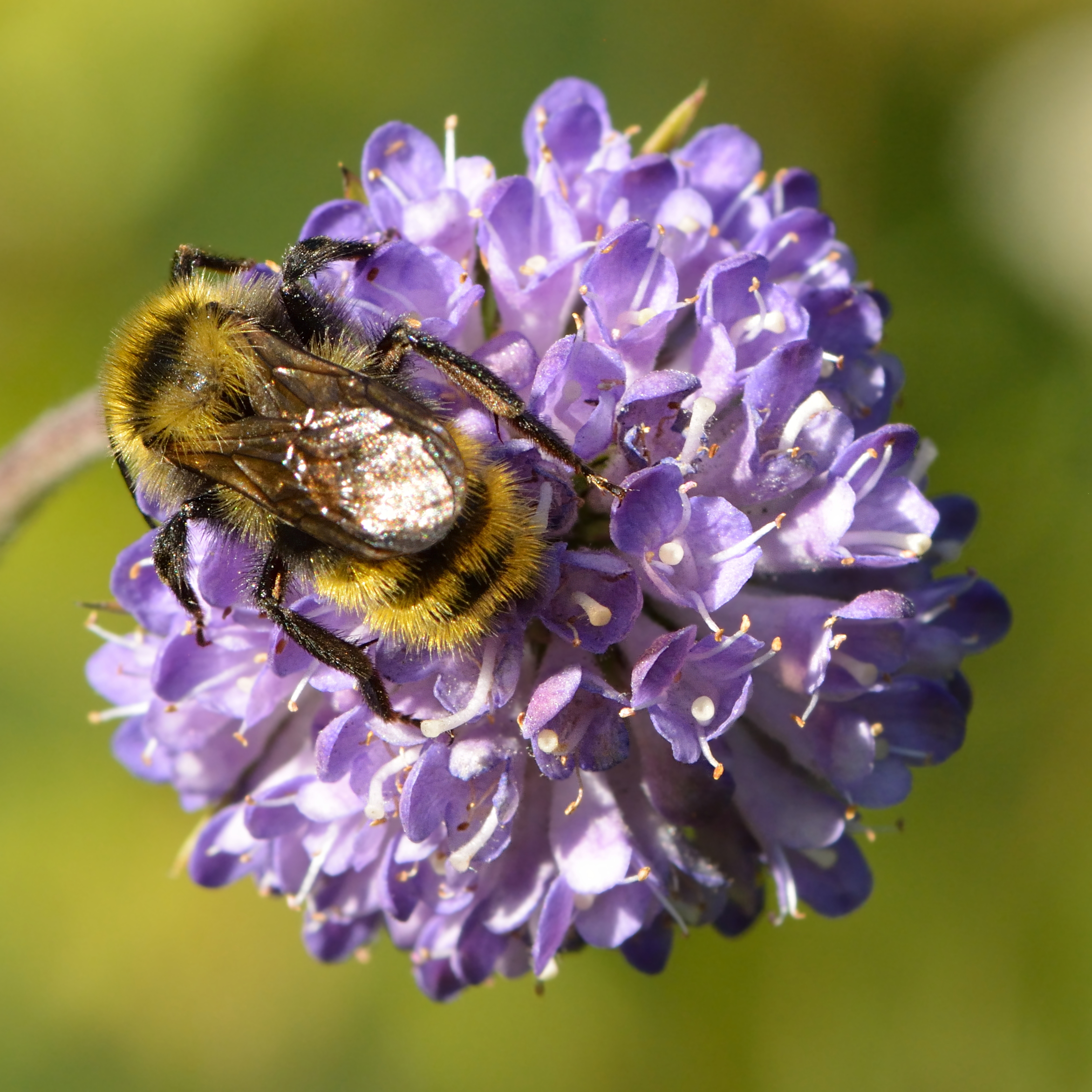
Bombus campestris

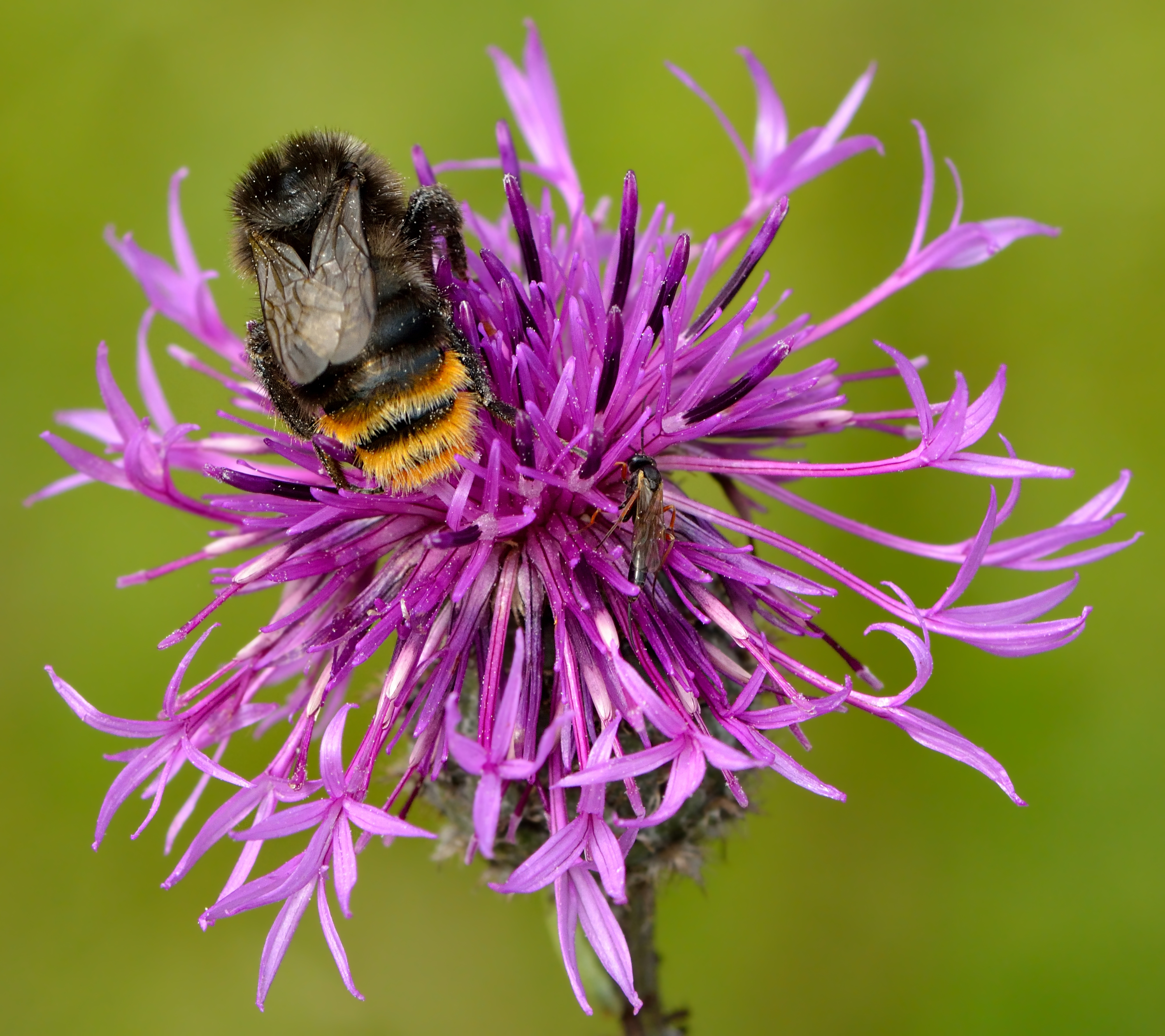
Bombus rupestris

- Bombus ashtoni – Ashton cuckoo bumble bee
- Bombus barbutellus – Barbut's cuckoo-bee
- Bombus bellardii
- Bombus bohemicus – Gypsy's cuckoo bumble bee
- Bombus branickii
- Bombus campestris
- Bombus chinensis
- Bombus citrinus – lemon cuckoo bumble bee
- Bombus coreanus
- Bombus cornutus
- Bombus expolitus
- Bombus ferganicus
- Bombus fernaldae – Fernald's cuckoo bumble bee
- Bombus flavidus
- Bombus insularis – indiscriminate cuckoo bumble bee
- Bombus maxillosus
- Bombus monozonus
- Bombus morawitzianus
- Bombus norvegicus
- Bombus novus
- Bombus perezi
- Bombus quadricolor
- Bombus rupestris
- Bombus skorikovi
- Bombus suckleyi – Suckley's cuckoo bumble bee
- Bombus sylvestris – forest cuckoo bumble bee
- Bombus tibetanus
- Bombus turneri
- Bombus variabilis – variable cuckoo bumble bee
- Bombus vestalis – vestal cuckoo bumble bee

== Subgenus Pyrobombus ==
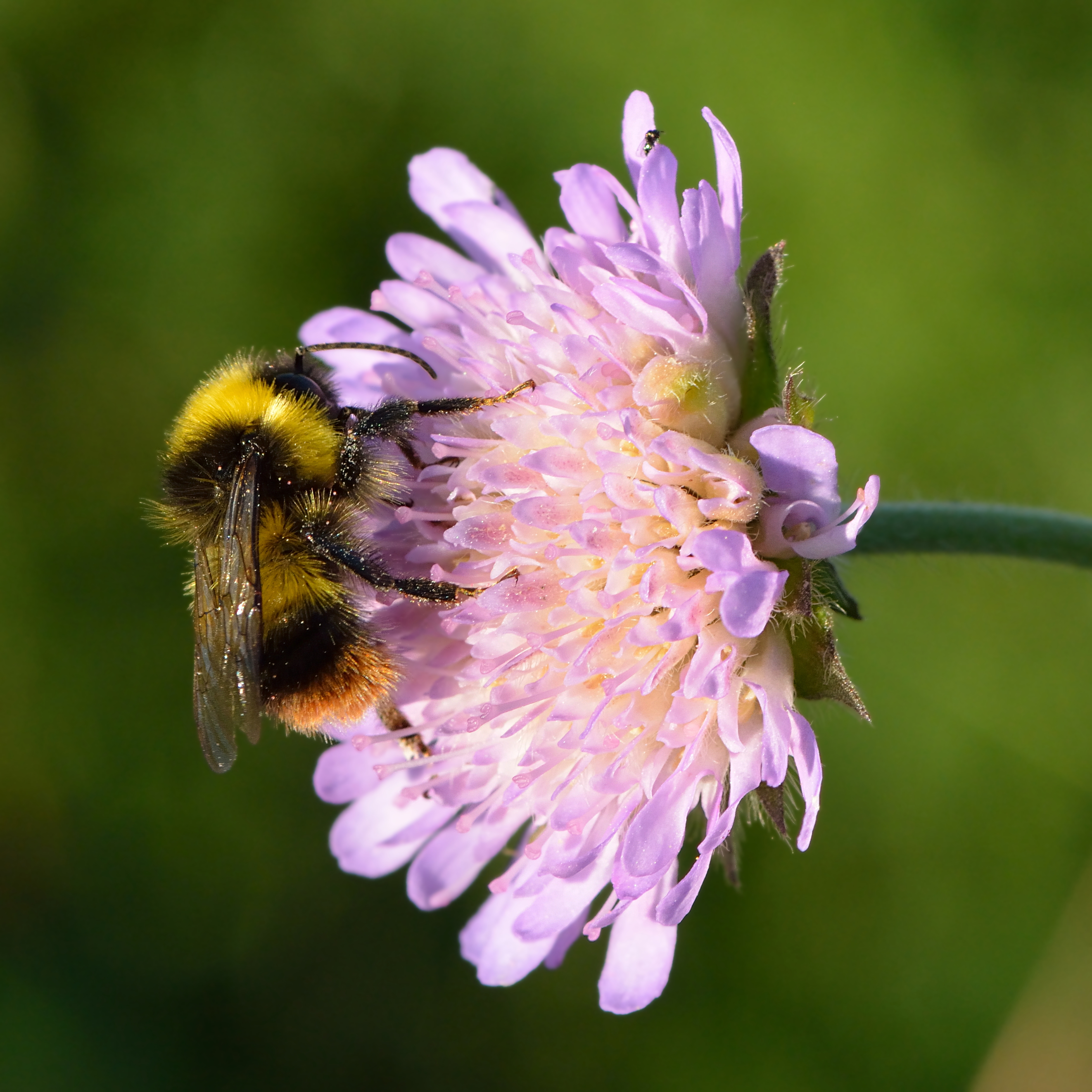
Bombus pratorum (male)

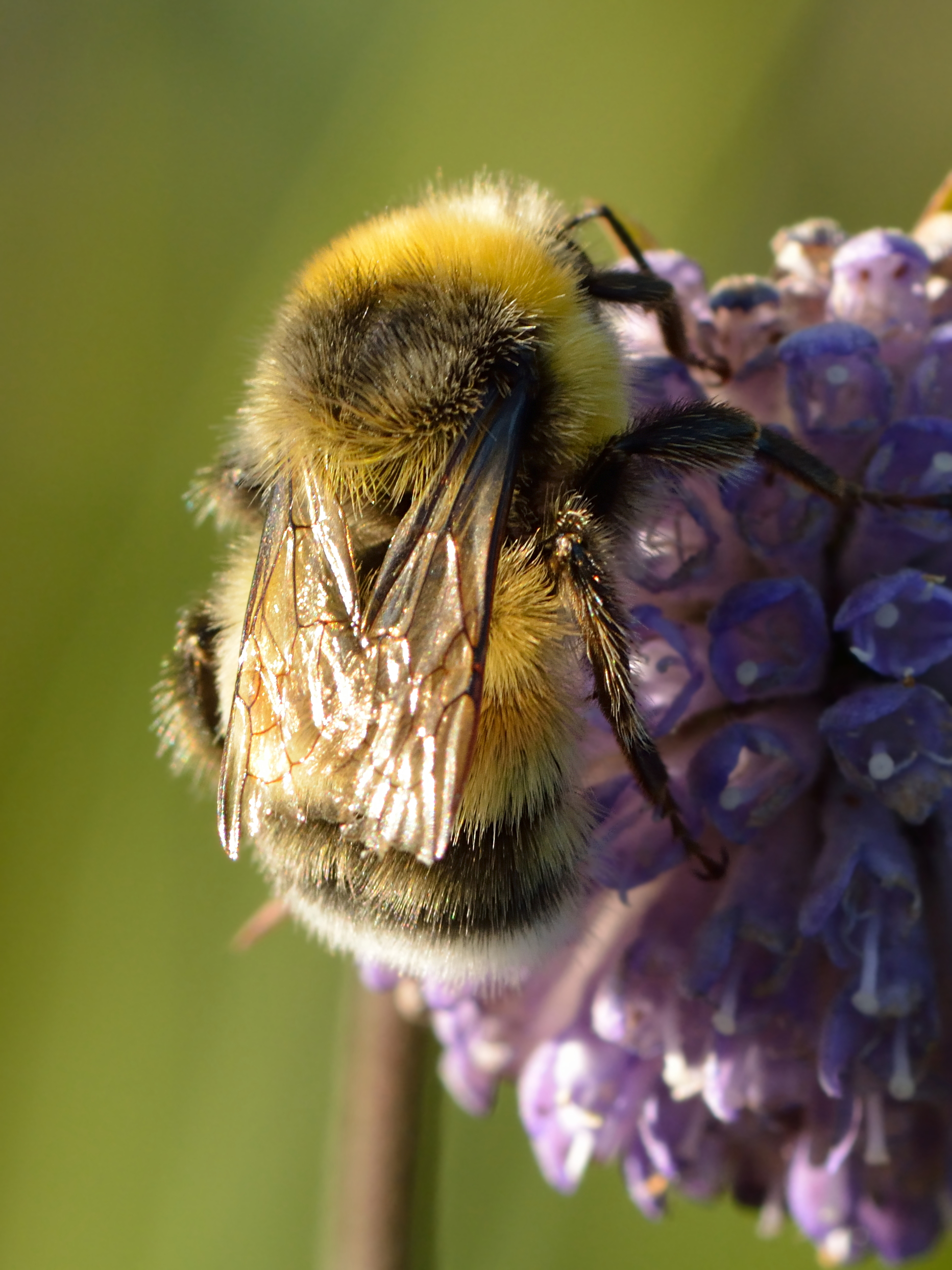
Bombus jonellus

- Bombus abnormis
- Bombus ardens
- Bombus avanus
- Bombus beaticola
- Bombus bifarius – two-form bumble bee
- Bombus bimaculatus – two-spotted bumble bee
- Bombus biroi
- Bombus brodmannicus
- Bombus caliginosus – obscure bumble bee
- Bombus centralis – Great Basin bumble bee
- Bombus cingulatus – small tree bumble bee
- Bombus cockerelli – Cockerell's bumble bee
- Bombus ephippiatus
- Bombus flavescens
- Bombus flavifrons – yellow-fronted bumble bee
- Bombus frigidus – frigid bumble bee
- Bombus haematurus
- Bombus huntii – Hunt's bumble bee
- Bombus hypnorum – tree bumble bee
- Bombus impatiens – common eastern bumble bee
- Bombus infirmus
- Bombus infrequens
- Bombus johanseni
- Bombus jonellus – small heath bumble bee
- Bombus kotzschi
- Bombus lapponicus
- Bombus lemniscatus
- Bombus lepidus
- Bombus luteipes
- Bombus melanopygus – black-tailed bumble bee
- Bombus mirus
- Bombus mixtus – fuzzy-horned bumble bee
- Bombus modestus
- Bombus monticola – bilberry bumble bee
- Bombus oceanicus
- Bombus parthenius
- Bombus perplexus – perplexing bumble bee, confusing bumble bee
- Bombus picipes
- Bombus pratorum – early bumble bee
- Bombus pressus
- Bombus pyrenaeus
- Bombus rotundiceps
- Bombus sandersoni – Sanderson bumble bee
- Bombus sitkensis – Sitka bumble bee
- Bombus sonani
- Bombus subtypicus
- Bombus sylvicola – forest bumble bee
- Bombus ternarius – tricolored bumble bee, orange-belted bumble bee
- Bombus vagans – half-black bumble bee
- Bombus vancouverensis
- Bombus vandykei – Van Dyke's bumble bee
- Bombus vosnesenskii – yellow-faced bumble bee
- Bombus wilmattae

== Subgenus Sibiricobombus ==
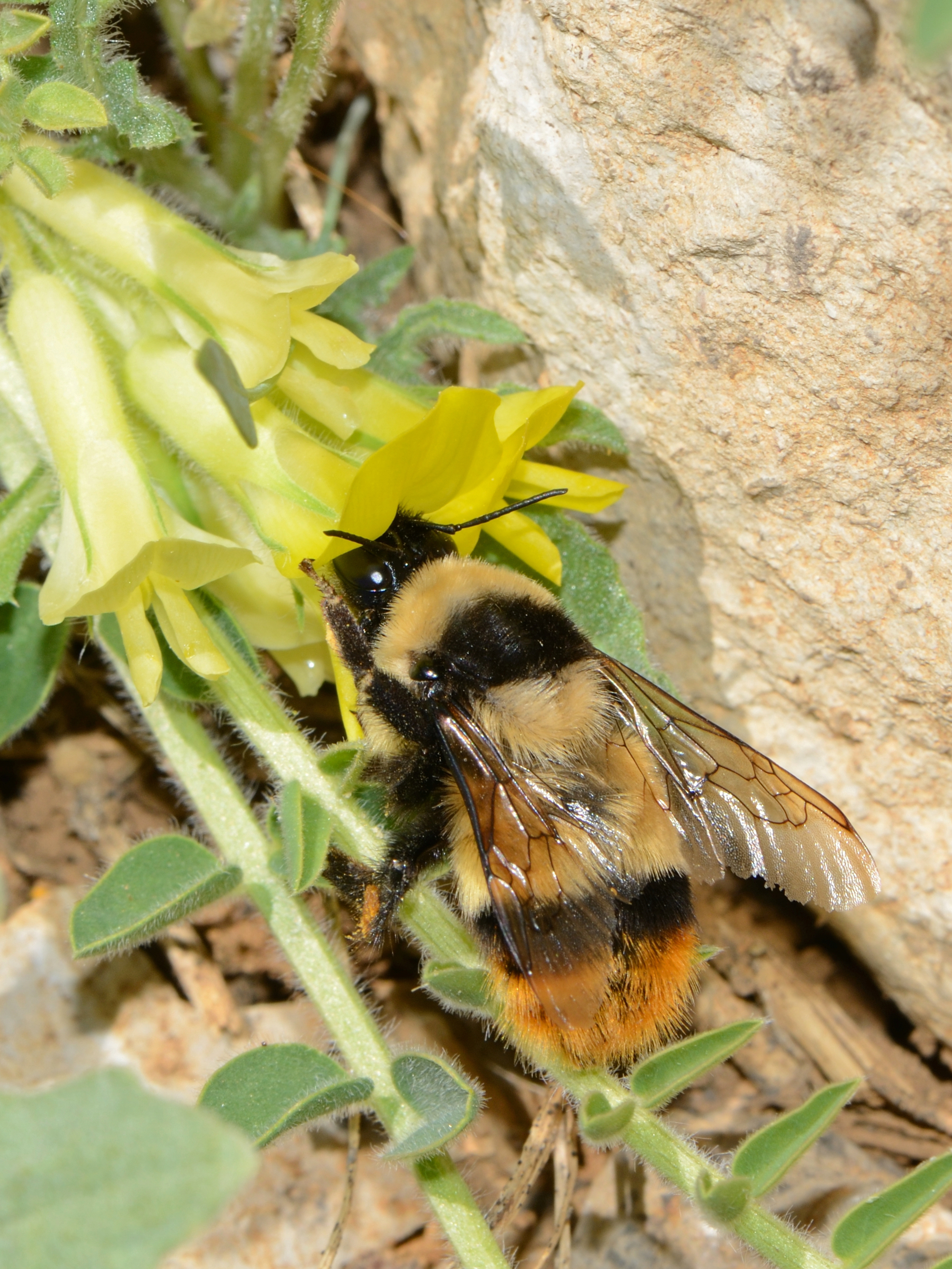
Bombus niveatus

- Bombus asiaticus
- Bombus morawitzi
- Bombus niveatus
- Bombus oberti
- Bombus obtusus
- Bombus sibiricus
- Bombus sulfureus

== Subgenus Subterraneobombus ==
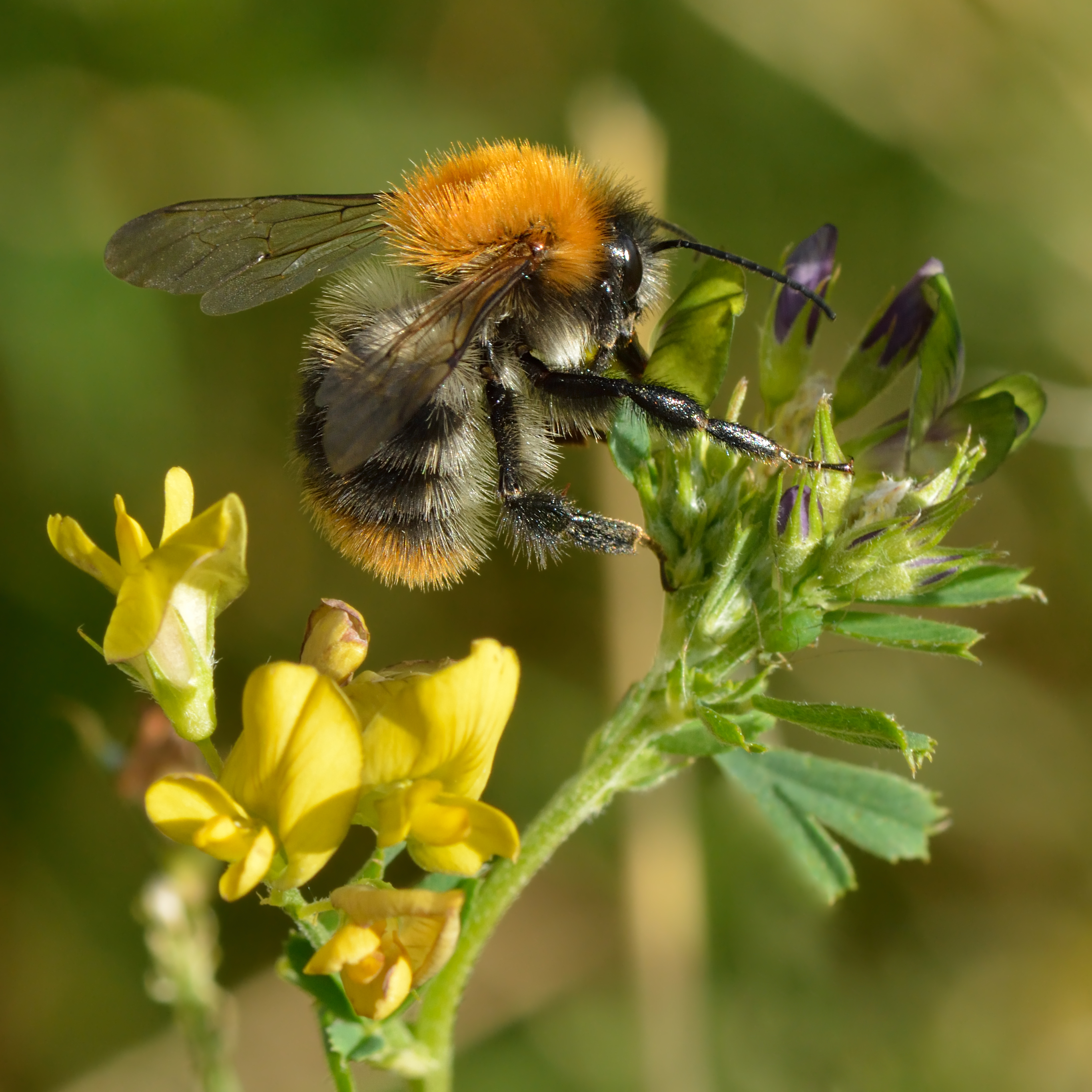
Bombus pascuorum

- Bombus amurensis
- Bombus appositus – mountain bumble bee
- Bombus borealis – northern amber bumble bee
- Bombus difficillimus
- Bombus distinguendus
- Bombus fedtschenkoi
- Bombus fragrans
- Bombus melanurus
- Bombus mongolensis
- Bombus personatus
- Bombus subterraneus – short-haired bumble bee

== Subgenus Thoracobombus ==
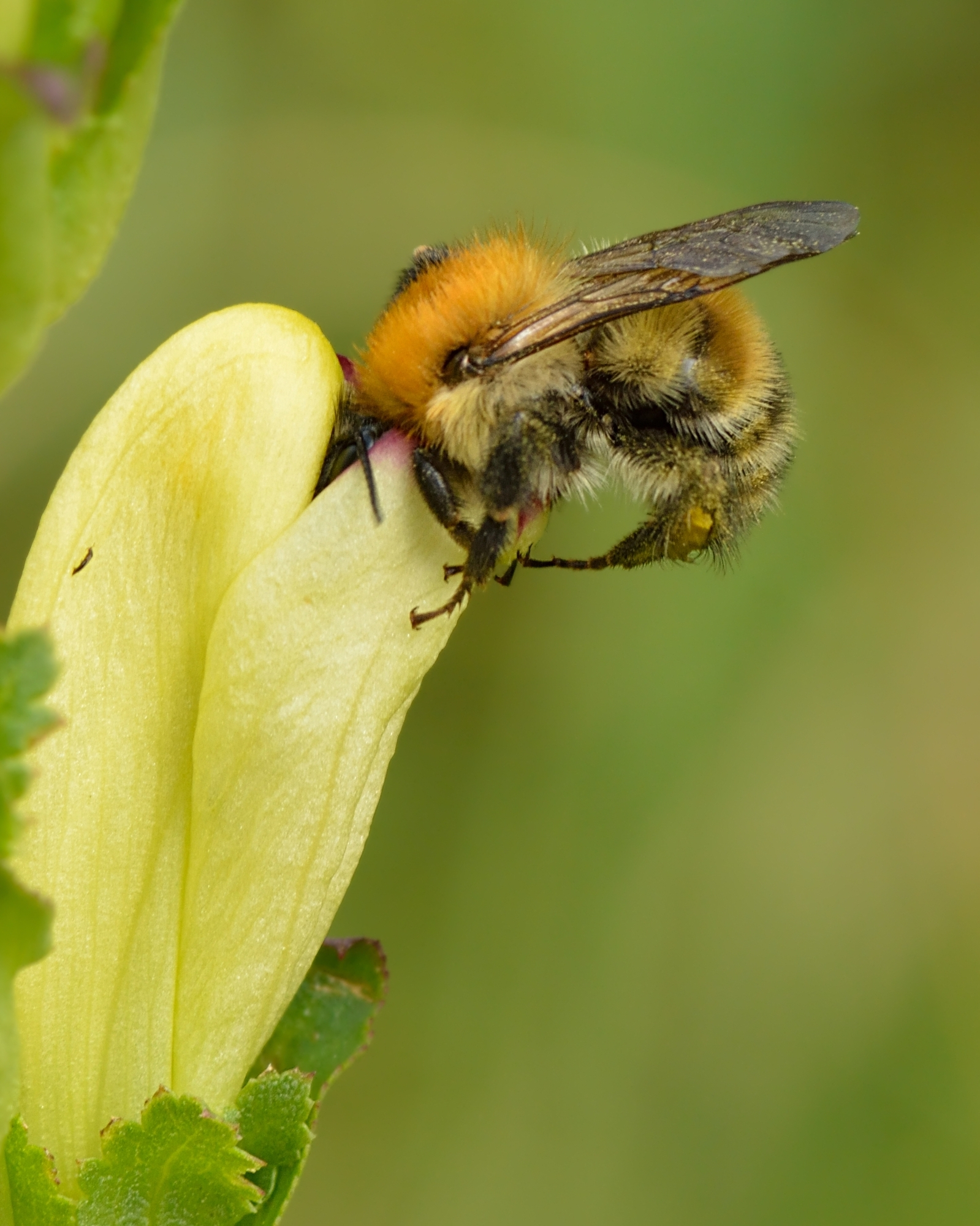
Bombus schrencki

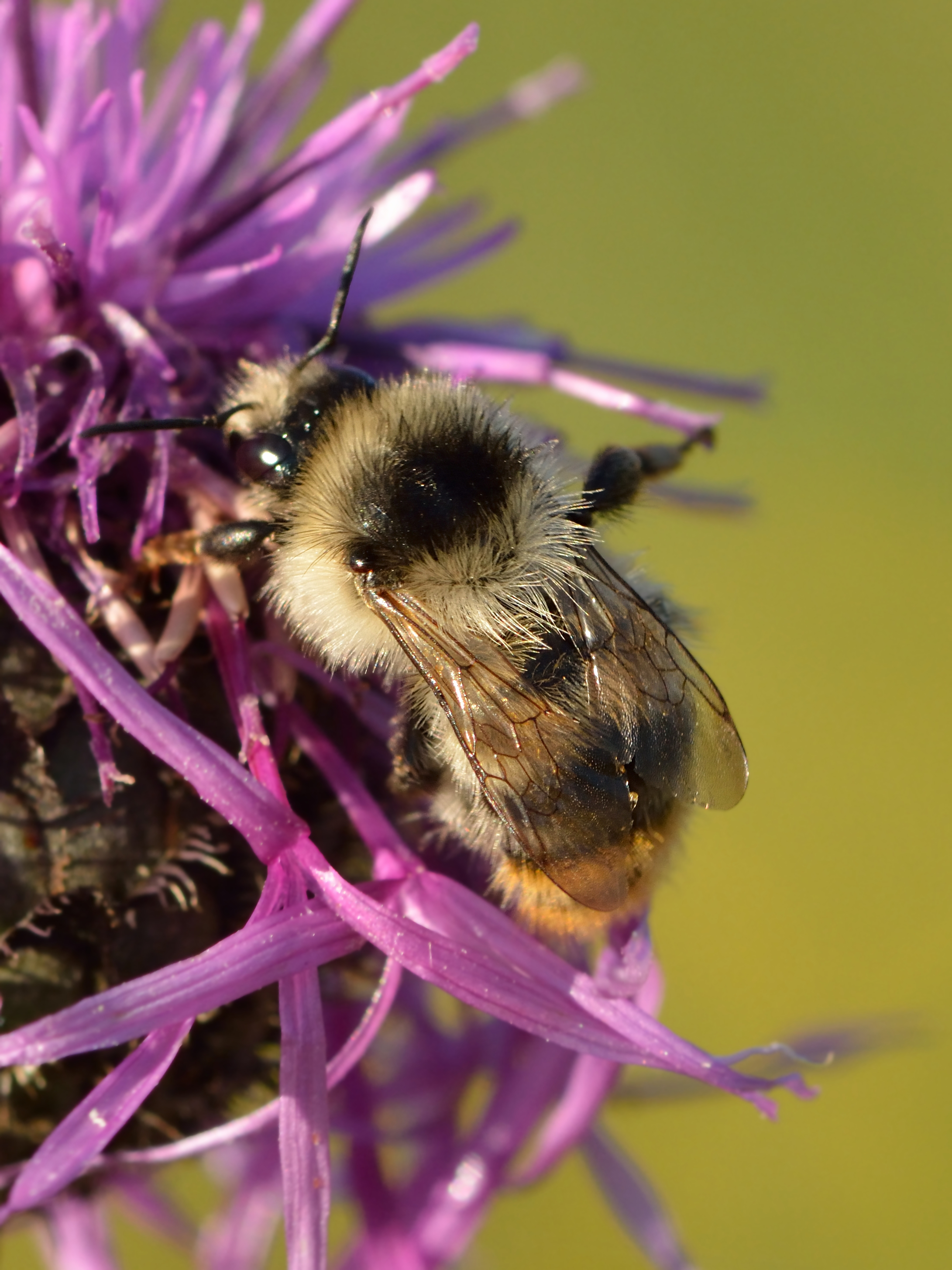
Bombus sylvarum

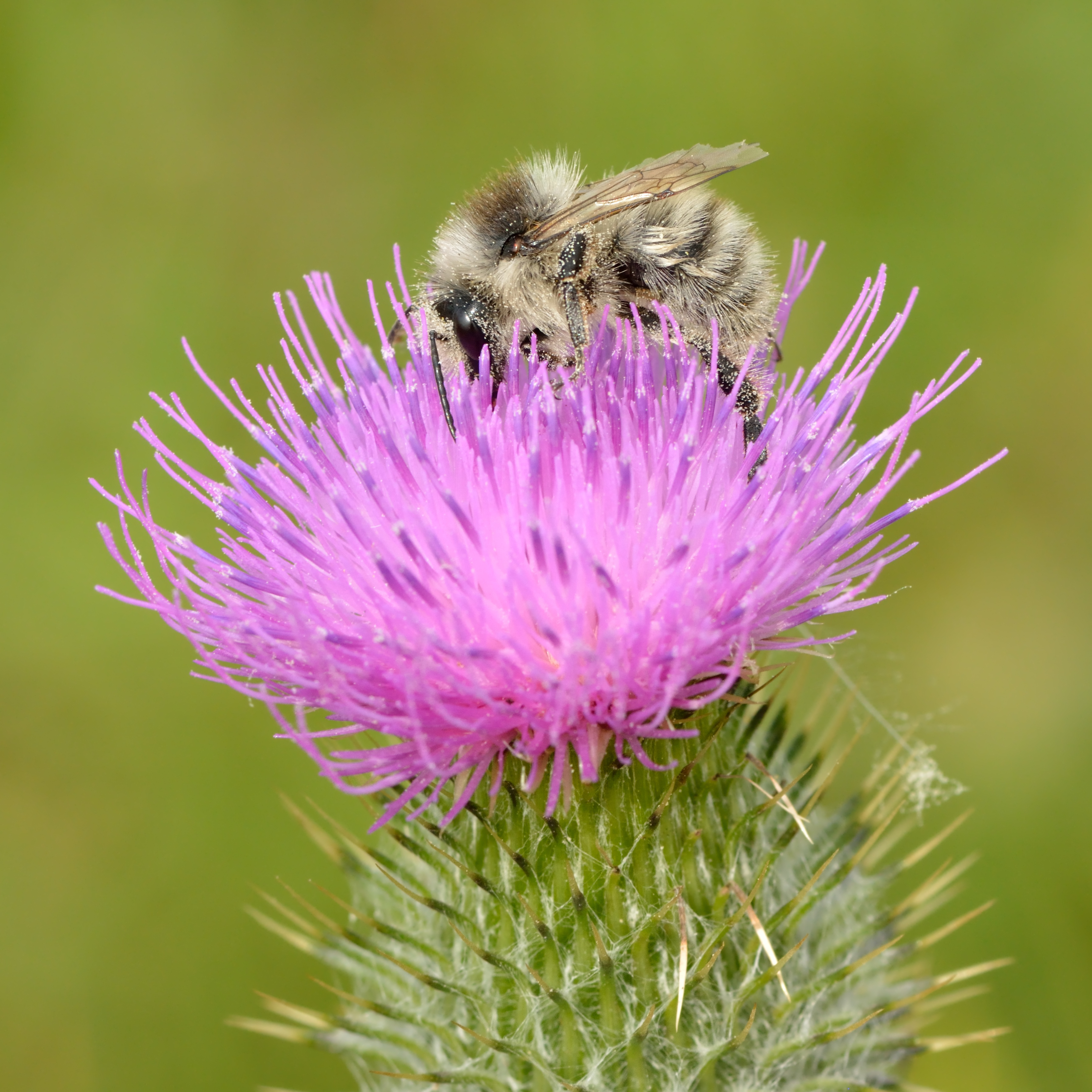
Bombus veteranus

- Bombus anachoreta
- Bombus armeniacus – Armenian bumble bee
- Bombus atripes
- Bombus bahiensis
- Bombus bellicosus
- Bombus brasiliensis
- Bombus brevivillus
- Bombus californicus
- Bombus dahlbomii
- Bombus deuteronymus
- Bombus digressus
- Bombus diligens
- Bombus excellens
- Bombus exil
- Bombus fervidus – yellow bumble bee, golden northern bumble bee
- Bombus filchnerae
- Bombus hedini
- Bombus honshuensis
- Bombus humilis – brown-banded carder bee
- Bombus imitator
- Bombus impetuosus
- Bombus inexspectatus
- Bombus laesus
- Bombus medius
- Bombus mesomelas
- Bombus mexicanus
- Bombus mlokosievitzii
- Bombus morio
- Bombus mucidus
- Bombus muscorum – large carder bee or moss carder bee
- Bombus opifex
- Bombus opulentus
- Bombus pascuorum – common carder bee
- Bombus pauloensis
- Bombus pensylvanicus – American bumble bee
- Bombus persicus
- Bombus pomorum – apple humble-bee
- Bombus pseudobaicalensis
- Bombus pullatus
- Bombus remotus
- Bombus rubriventris (probably extinct)
- Bombus ruderarius – red-shanked carder bee or red-shanked bumble bee
- Bombus schrencki
- Bombus sonorus – Sonoran bumble bee
- Bombus steindachneri
- Bombus sylvarum – shrill carder bee
- Bombus transversalis
- Bombus tricornis
- Bombus trinominatus
- Bombus velox
- Bombus weisi
- Bombus veteranus
- Bombus zonatus

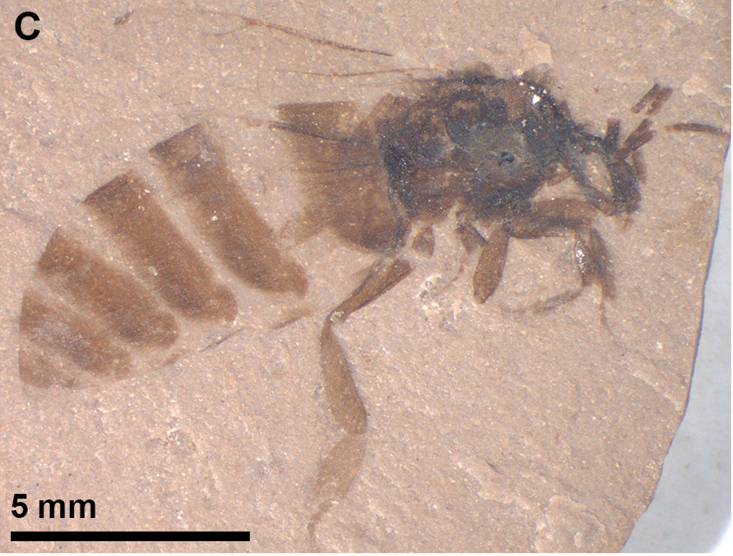
Bombus vetustus holotype male

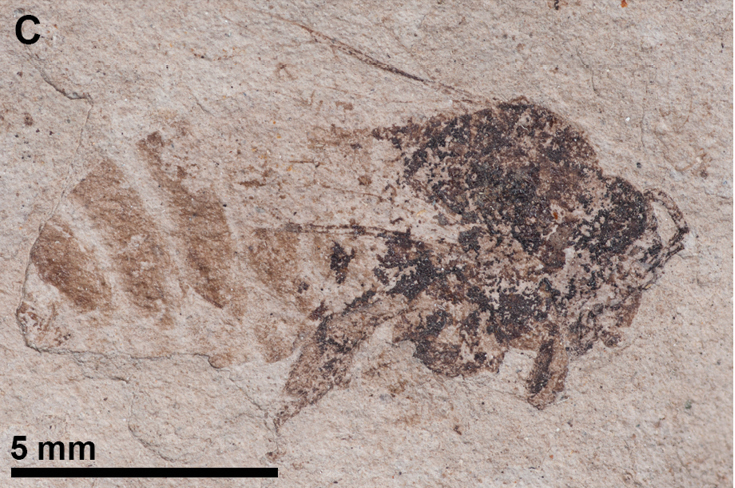
Calyptapis florissantensis paratype female

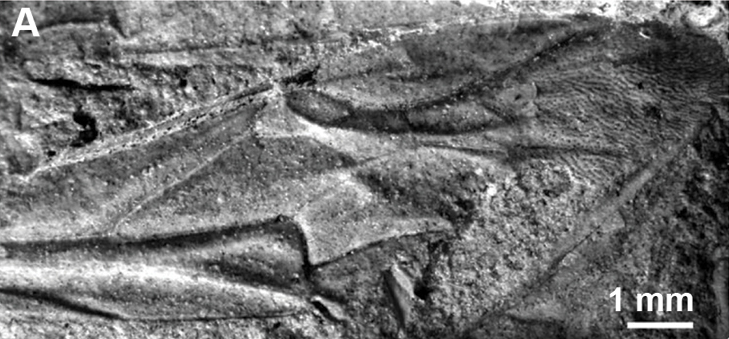
Oligobombus cuspidatus holotype forewing

== Subgenus incertae sedis ==
- †“Bombus” anacolus - Middle Miocene Shanwang Formation, Shandong Province, China
- †Bombus? crassipes - Late Miocene Krottensee deposits, Czech Republic
- †“Bombus” dilectus - Middle Miocene Shanwang Formation, Shandong Province, China
- †“Bombus” luianus - Middle Miocene Shanwang Formation, Shandong Province, China
- †Bombus proavus - Middle Miocene, Latah Formation, Washington, USA
- †Bombus vetustus - Late Miocene, Botchi Formation, Botchi River, Khabarovsk Krai, Russia

== Genus †Calyptapis ==
- †Calyptapis florissantensis - Late Eocene, Florissant Formation, Colorado

== Genus †Oligobombus ==
- †Oligobombus cuspidatus - Late Eocene, Bembridge Marls, Isle of Wight, UK
