= Bombus amurensis =

Scientific classification
- Domain: Eukaryota
- Kingdom: Animalia
- Phylum: Arthropoda
- Class: Insecta
- Order: Hymenoptera
- Family: Apidae
- Genus: Bombus
- Subgenus: Subterraneobombus
- Species: B. amurensis

Binomial name
- Bombus amurensis Radoszkowski, 1862

Species of bee

Bombus amurensis is a bumblebee belonging to the subgenus Subterraneobombus, first described by Radoszkowski in 1862. It lives primarily in China, Mongolia and the far south-east of Russia.

== Appearance ==
Bombus amurensis has short black hair on its head (but with a mixture of yellow hair in males), yellow on the upper part of the body except for a ring -shaped black spot in the middle between the wing brackets, and yellow even to the rear body.
