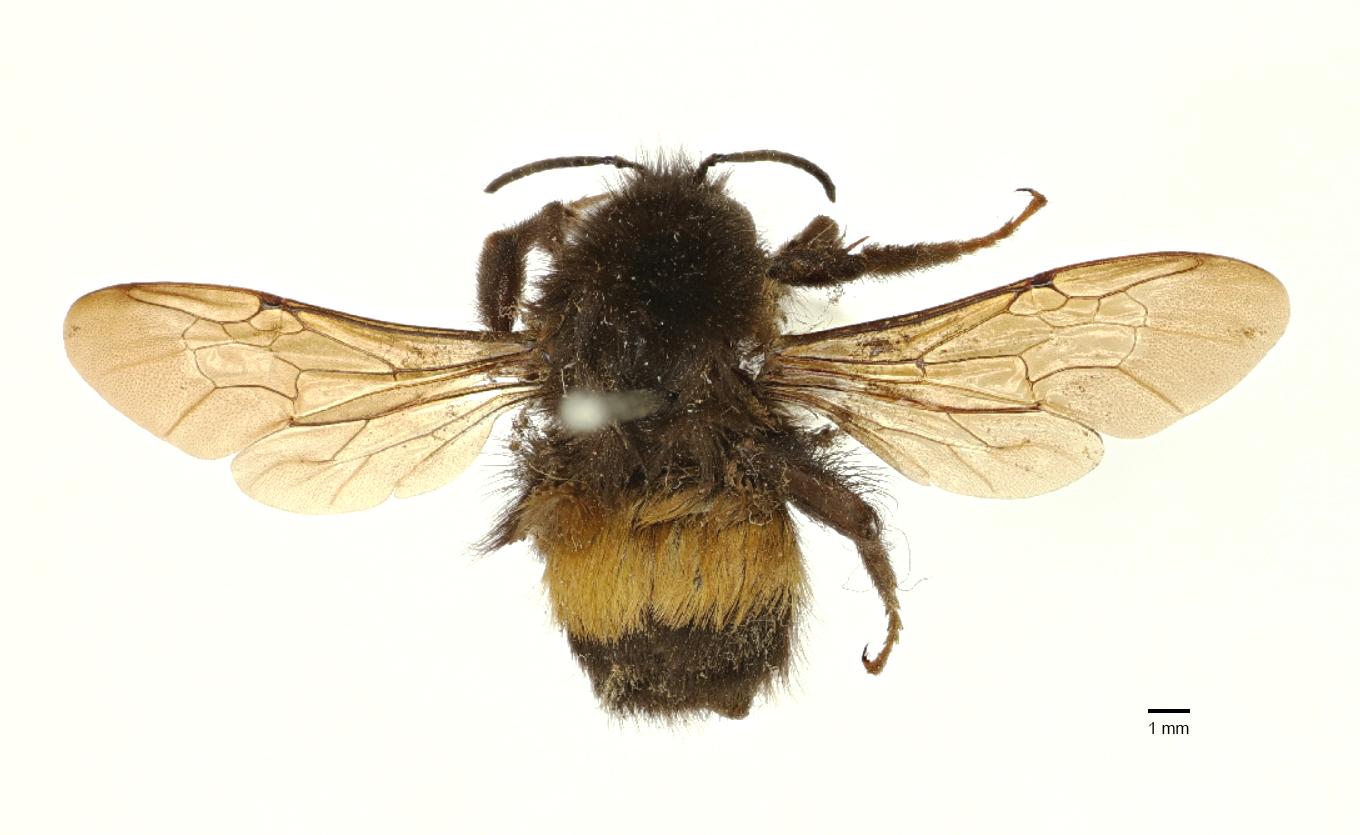
- Holotype at the Natural History Museum, London

Scientific classification
- Kingdom: Animalia
- Phylum: Arthropoda
- Class: Insecta
- Order: Hymenoptera
- Family: Apidae
- Genus: Bombus
- Subgenus: Bombus (Megabombus)
- Species: B. irisanensis

Binomial name
- Bombus irisanensis Cockerell, 1910

= Bombus irisanensis =

Species of Philippine bumble bee

Bombus irisanensis is a rare species of bumblebee endemic to Luzon in the Philippines.

The hair on the head is mostly black, the thorax is dorsally black and reddish-yellow on the sides. The first two segments of the abdomen are yellow and the rest are black. The legs are black and the wings are sooty colored, but "transparent enough for print to be easily read through them".

The holotype specimen was collected some time between 1906 and 1910, in late May, by an unknown collector. It was deposited in the Natural History Museum, London, and first formally named by Theodore Dru Alison Cockerell in 1910. It is placed in the subgenus Bombus (Megabombus). Bombus irisanensis was named for Irisan, a barangay (district) in Baguio, where it was collected.

The first public digital record of Bombus irisanensis was added to iNaturalist in June 2019 by Paul Engler. The record may be the first documentation of its continued existence since the 1990s.

Several published articles note it was assessed as "Vulnerable" on the IUCN Red List. It was not listed on the IUCN website as of December 2020.
