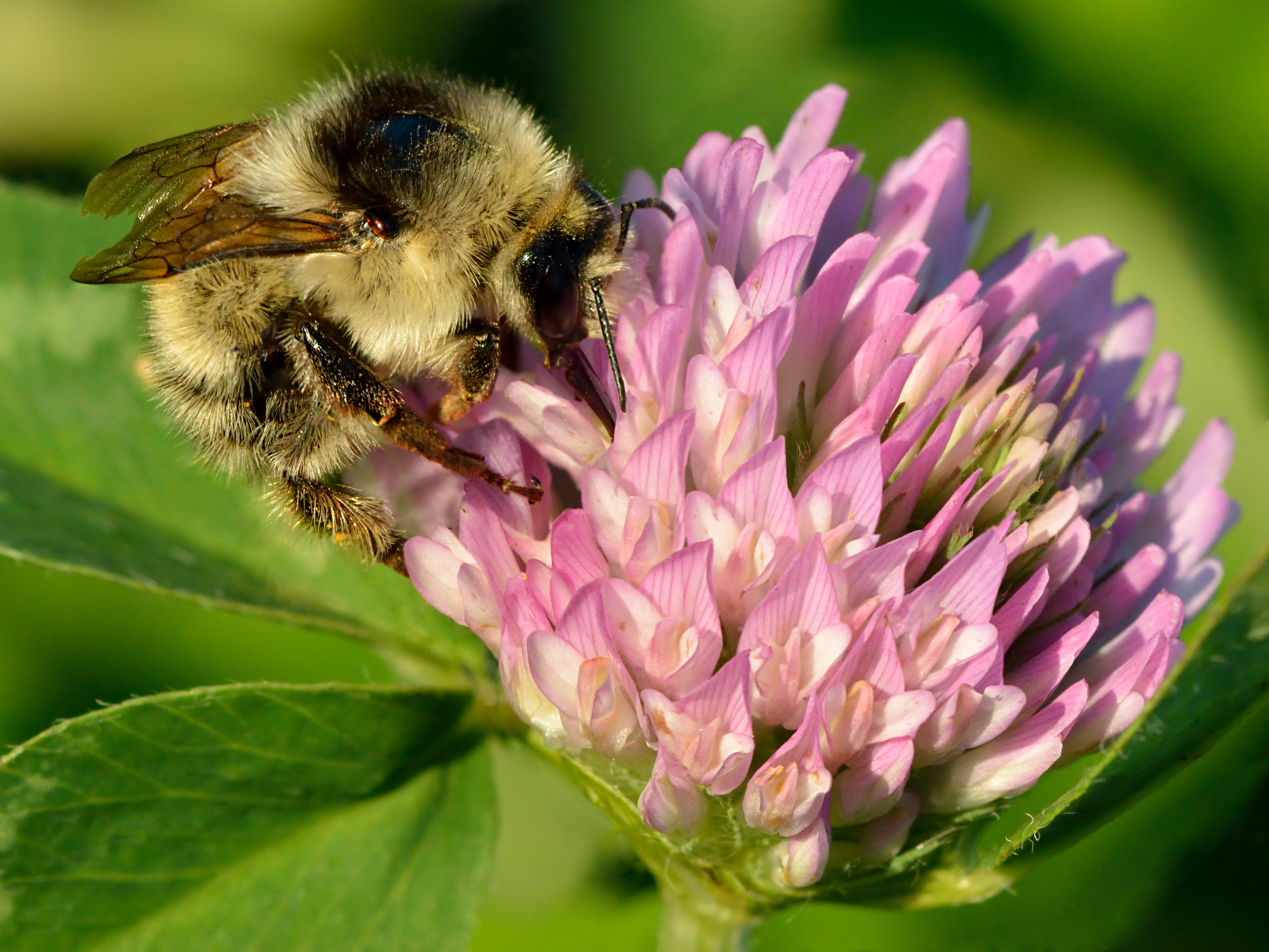

Scientific classification
- Kingdom: Animalia
- Phylum: Arthropoda
- Clade: Pancrustacea
- Class: Insecta
- Order: Hymenoptera
- Family: Apidae
- Genus: Bombus
- Subgenus: Thoracobombus
- Species: B. veteranus

Binomial name
- Bombus veteranus (Fabricius, 1793)

Synonyms
- Apis veterana Fabricius, 1793; Bombus arenicola Thomson, 1872

= Bombus veteranus =

Species of bee

Bombus veteranus, is a species of bumblebee in the subgenus Thoracobombus. The species is native to much of central Europe, Romania, Lithuania, Estonia, Finland.
