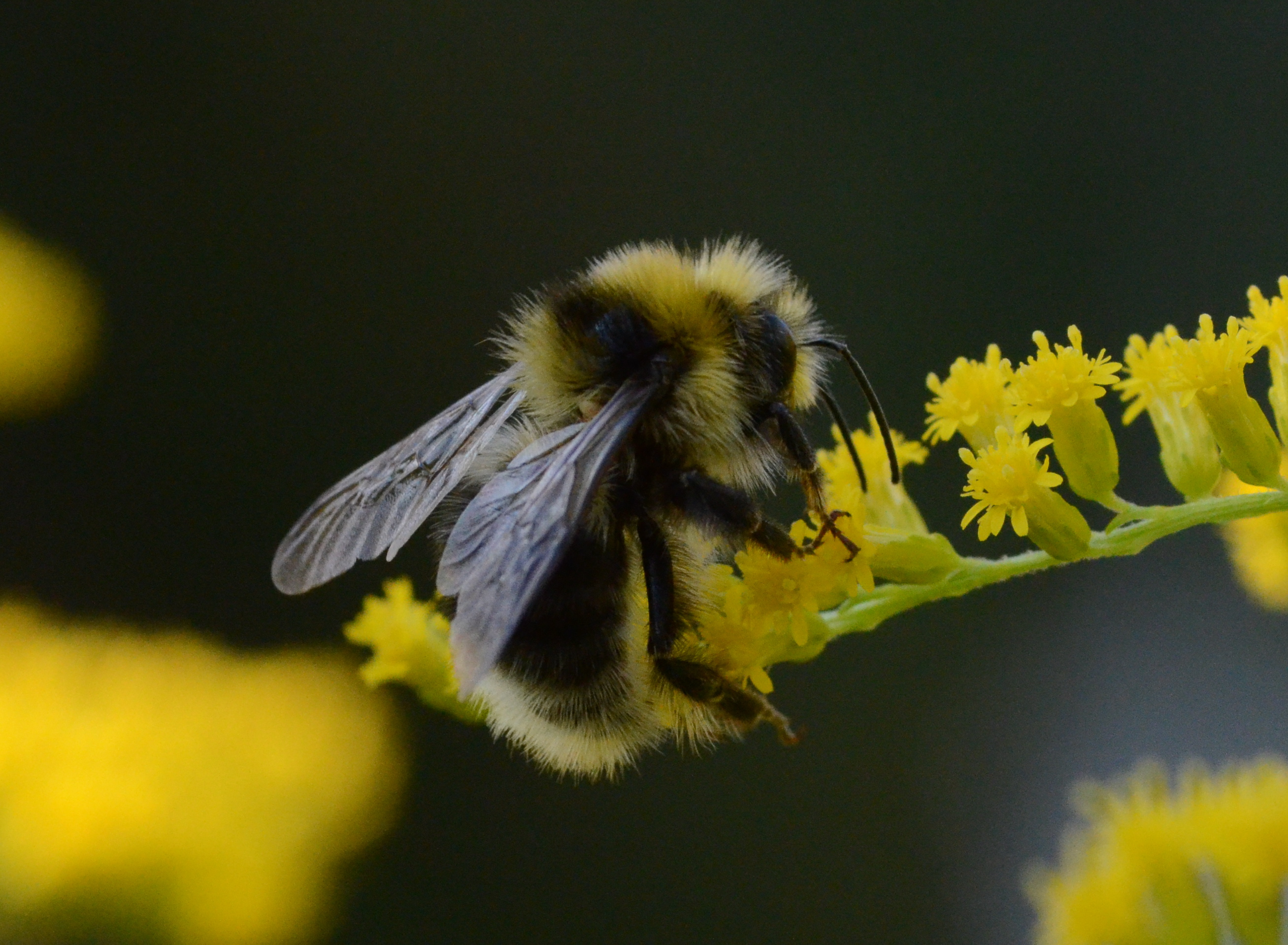

Scientific classification
- Domain: Eukaryota
- Kingdom: Animalia
- Phylum: Arthropoda
- Class: Insecta
- Order: Hymenoptera
- Family: Apidae
- Genus: Bombus
- Species: B. semenoviellus

Binomial name
- Bombus semenoviellus Skorikov, 1910

= Bombus semenoviellus =

Species of insect

Bombus semenoviellus is a species of insect belonging to the family Apidae.

It is native to Europe.

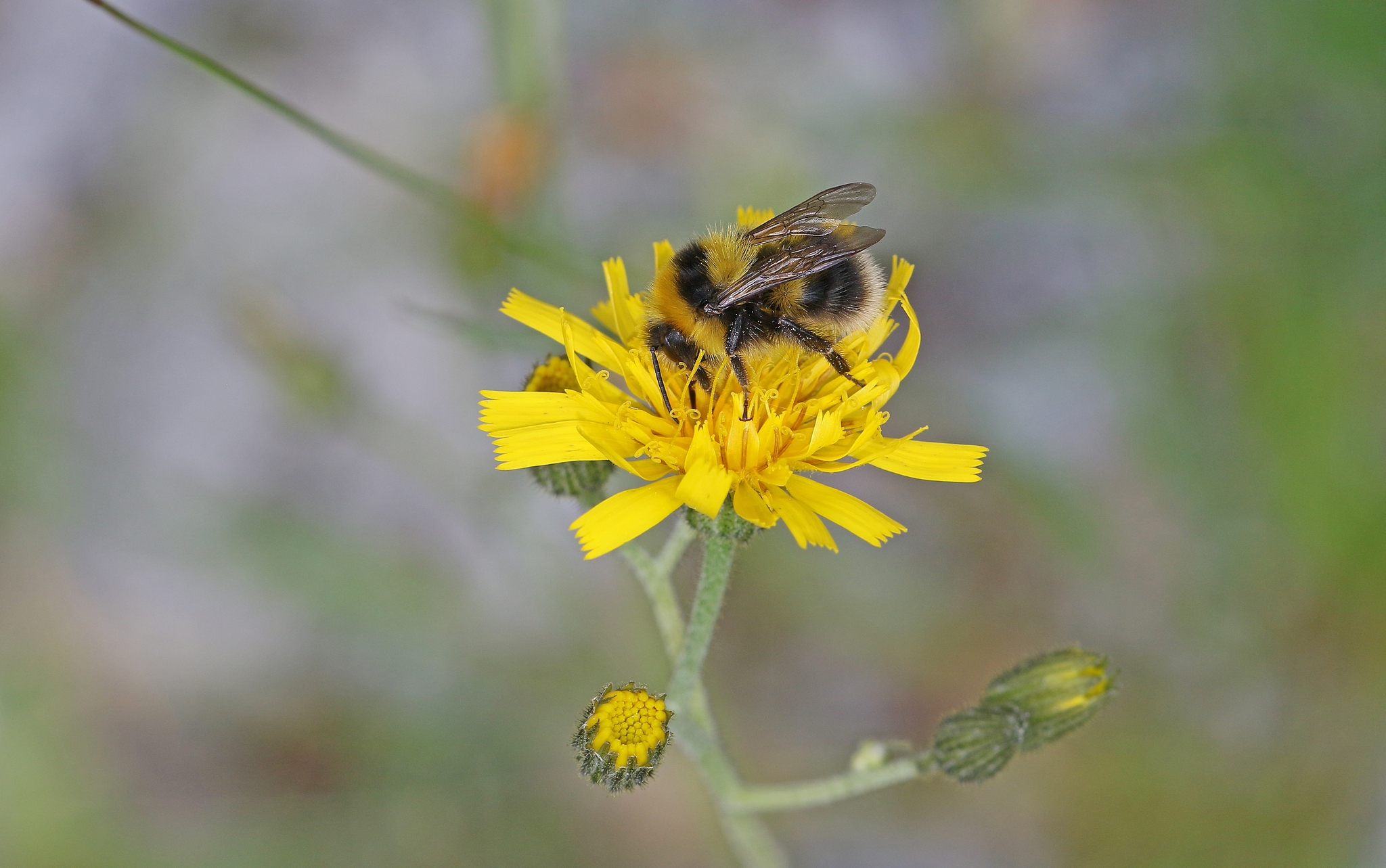
Bombus semenoviellus, Bayerischer Wald, Freyung-Grafenau, Bayern, Germany, July 2021

== Range ==
The species has been invading towards west in recent years. The westernmost location so far is in Lower Saxony; from here eastwards to Tuva, east of this only one report from Panfilov et al. 1961 from Sakha / Yakutia; northwards to southern Norway (first discovered here in 2013 in Hvaler; no evidence from Sweden), in Finland to the Arctic Circle, in Russia to Karelia, Arkhangelsk, Komi and Perm; south to Bavaria, Northern Austria, Slovakia, Ukraine and Orenburg. In Germany, the first record for Central Europe was made in Schleswig-Holstein in 1998 (van der Smissen & Rasmont 2000), in the following years the species was also reported from Brandenburg, Saxony, Thuringia, Saxony-Anhalt, Bavaria, Mecklenburg-Western Pomerania and Lower Saxony. In Austria, a find from 2009 from the Waldviertel in Lower Austria is known to date (Streinzer, 2010).

== Habitat ==
Originally sparse boreal coniferous forests of the southern taiga. Also forest steppe, extensively used grassland, semi-arid grassland, ruderal areas, wet meadows. From the lowlands to the colline altitude. In Central Europe, forest clearings, forest paths and forest edges, but also diverse and flower-rich cultural landscapes such as meadows, ruderal areas, gardens and parks near human settlements with a warm, dry summer character (Frommer 2018).

== Ecology ==
Occurs from late April to late August. Overwintered females appear from the end of April, young males in July. This is a polylectic species. During the summer colony development phase, Asteraceae are preferred as fodder plants. Nests underground in abandoned mouse cauldrons. Pollenstorer. The colonies are not very strong in individuals.

== Etymology ==
Named after the Russian entomologist Andrey Petrovich Semyonov Tyan-Shansky (1866-?), Who collected parts of the type series.

== Taxonomy ==
Subgenus Cullumanobombus VOGT, 1911
