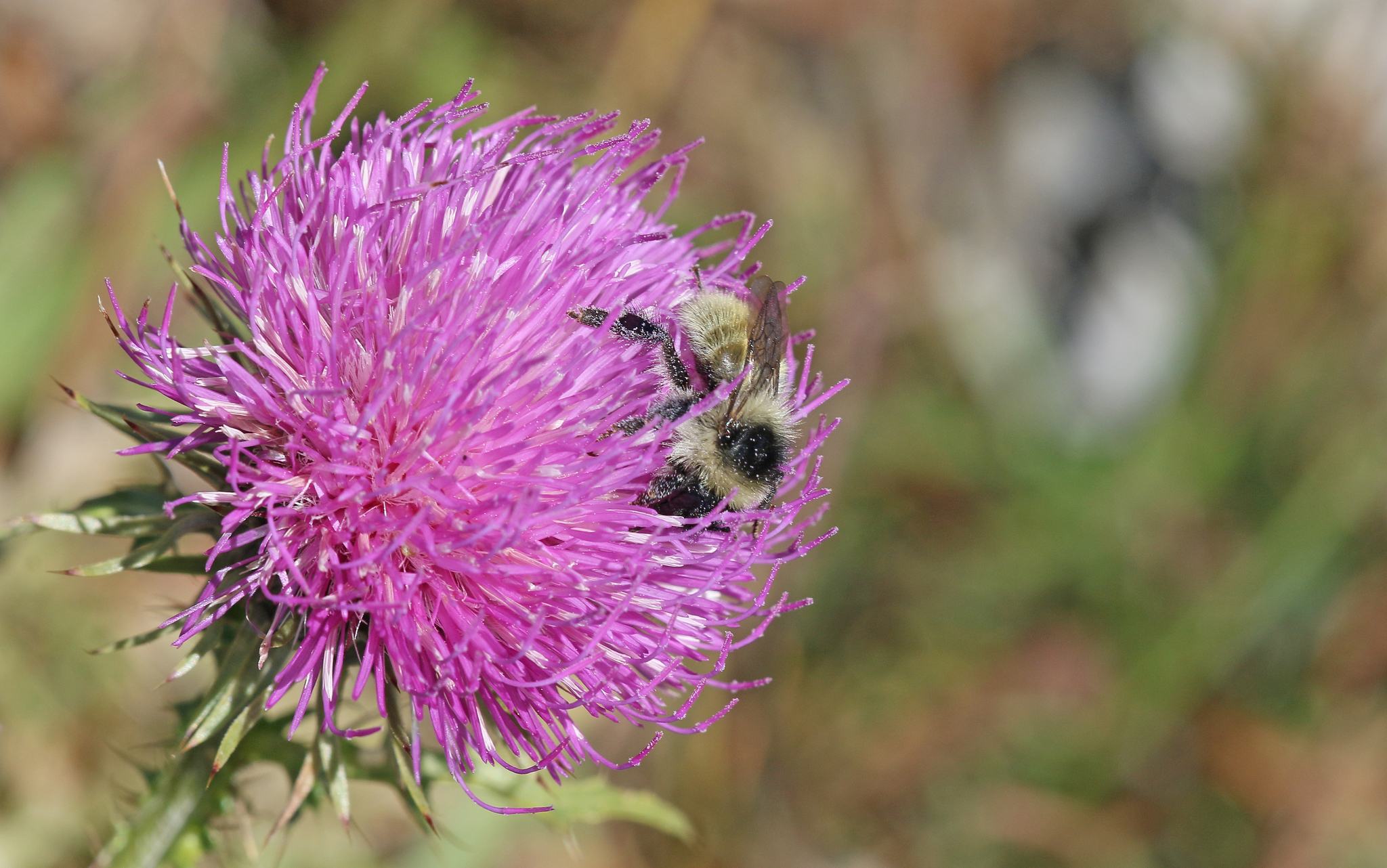
- Mercantour, Alpes-Maritimes, Provence-Alpes-Côte d'Azur, France

Scientific classification
- Kingdom: Animalia
- Phylum: Arthropoda
- Class: Insecta
- Order: Hymenoptera
- Family: Apidae
- Genus: Bombus
- Species: B. mesomelas

Binomial name
- Bombus mesomelas Gerstaecker, 1869

= Bombus mesomelas =

Species of bumblebee

Bombus mesomelas (also called black-backed bumblebee) is a species of bumblebees.

== Range ==
The nominate form lives in the Cantabrian Mountains, in the Pyrenees, the Alps, the Apennines, in the Giant Mountains and in the Carpathian Mountains, less often in the Central European Central Mountains. The subspecies Bombus mesomelas alboluteus VOGT, 1909 is disjointly distributed with a western population in the mountains of the Balkan Peninsula and an eastern one in the East Anatolian highlands, the Caucasus up to the Elburs. Lost in Germany, proven from Thuringia, Saxony and Bavaria (last find 1956). In Austria, with the exception of Burgenland, reported from all federal states. In Switzerland in the entire Alpine region and the Jura, historically also from the northern Alpine foothills.

== Habitat ==
The species is found on sunny mountain slopes. It favours dry and warm locations in the middle and high mountains. From the montane to the alpine altitude, in Central Europe already from 600 m.

== Ecology ==
The species is univoltine. The overwintered females appear around the end of May, young females and males from the end of August. Bombus mesomelas is a polylectic species. It nests mainly underground in abandoned mouse kettles, then nest-maker, but seldom also in the herb layer, then nest-builder. The species is a Pocketmaker. The colonies comprise 50 to 120 individuals.

== Etymology ==
From the Greek "meso" = "middle "and "mela " = "black"; because of the transverse band of black hair between the wings.

== Taxonomy ==
Subgenus Thoracobombus DALLA TORRE, 1880.

In Central Europe in the subspecies Bombus mesomelas mesomelas GERSTAECKER, 1869 occurs.

Synonyms: Megabombus mesomelas (GERSTAECKER, 1869); Bombus elegans mesomelas (GERSTAECKER, 1869); Bombus pomorum var.mesomelas (GERSTAECKER, 1869).
