= Bombus superbus =

Scientific classification
- Kingdom: Animalia
- Phylum: Arthropoda
- Clade: Pancrustacea
- Class: Insecta
- Order: Hymenoptera
- Family: Apidae
- Genus: Bombus
- Subgenus: Mendacibombus
- Species: B. superbus

Binomial name
- Bombus superbus Tkalcu, 1968

Species of bee

Bombus superbus is a rare species of bumblebee endemic to China, mostly occurring in areas over 4000 meters above sea level.
