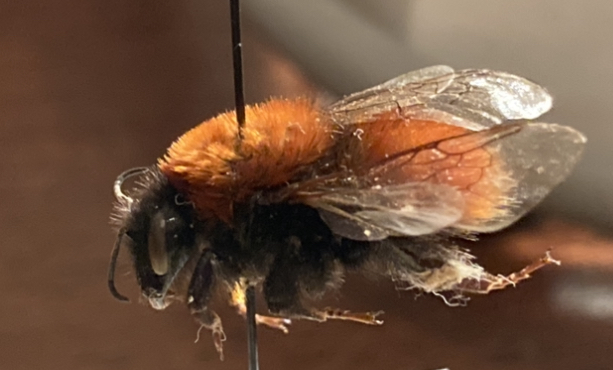
- Pinned specimen of Bombus morawitzi

Scientific classification
- Kingdom: Animalia
- Phylum: Arthropoda
- Clade: Pancrustacea
- Class: Insecta
- Order: Hymenoptera
- Family: Apidae
- Genus: Bombus
- Species: B. morawitzi

Binomial name
- Bombus morawitzi Radoszkowski, 1876

Synonyms
- Bombus morawitzii Radoszkowski, 1876

= Bombus morawitzi =

Species of bumblebee

Bombus morawitzi is a bumblebee species in the subgenus Sibiriocobombus endemic to Central Asia, particularly mountainous regions of Afghanistan, China, Kazakhstan, Kyrgyzstan, and Tajikistan.

The coloration of the species is very distinctive, with bright orange-red hair covering the thorax and abdomen. Males of the species have enlarged eyes in comparison to those of the females.
