= Bombus mongolensis =

Scientific classification
- Domain: Eukaryota
- Kingdom: Animalia
- Phylum: Arthropoda
- Class: Insecta
- Order: Hymenoptera
- Family: Apidae
- Genus: Bombus
- Subgenus: Subterraneobombus
- Species: B. mongolensis

Binomial name
- Bombus mongolensis Williams in Williams, An & Huang, 2011

Species of bee

Bombus mongolensis is a species of bumblebee that primarily lives in Mongolia. It lives at altitudes ranging from 1,300 to 2,100 meters (4,300 to 6,900 ft).

== Taxonomy ==
The species was discovered in 1892, but was believed then be a copy of Bombus melanurus. Later, Paul H. Williams held it to be a separate species by means of the appearance of the male genitalia and later by DNA analysis.

== Appearance ==
Bombus mongolensis is a larger, long-haired bumblebee with dense pale yellow-white hair with black stripes between the wing bases. The males can sometimes have pieces of yellow hair mixed in with the black stripes. On females the bright coat can reach the top of the legs, but the males' coats often end sooner.
