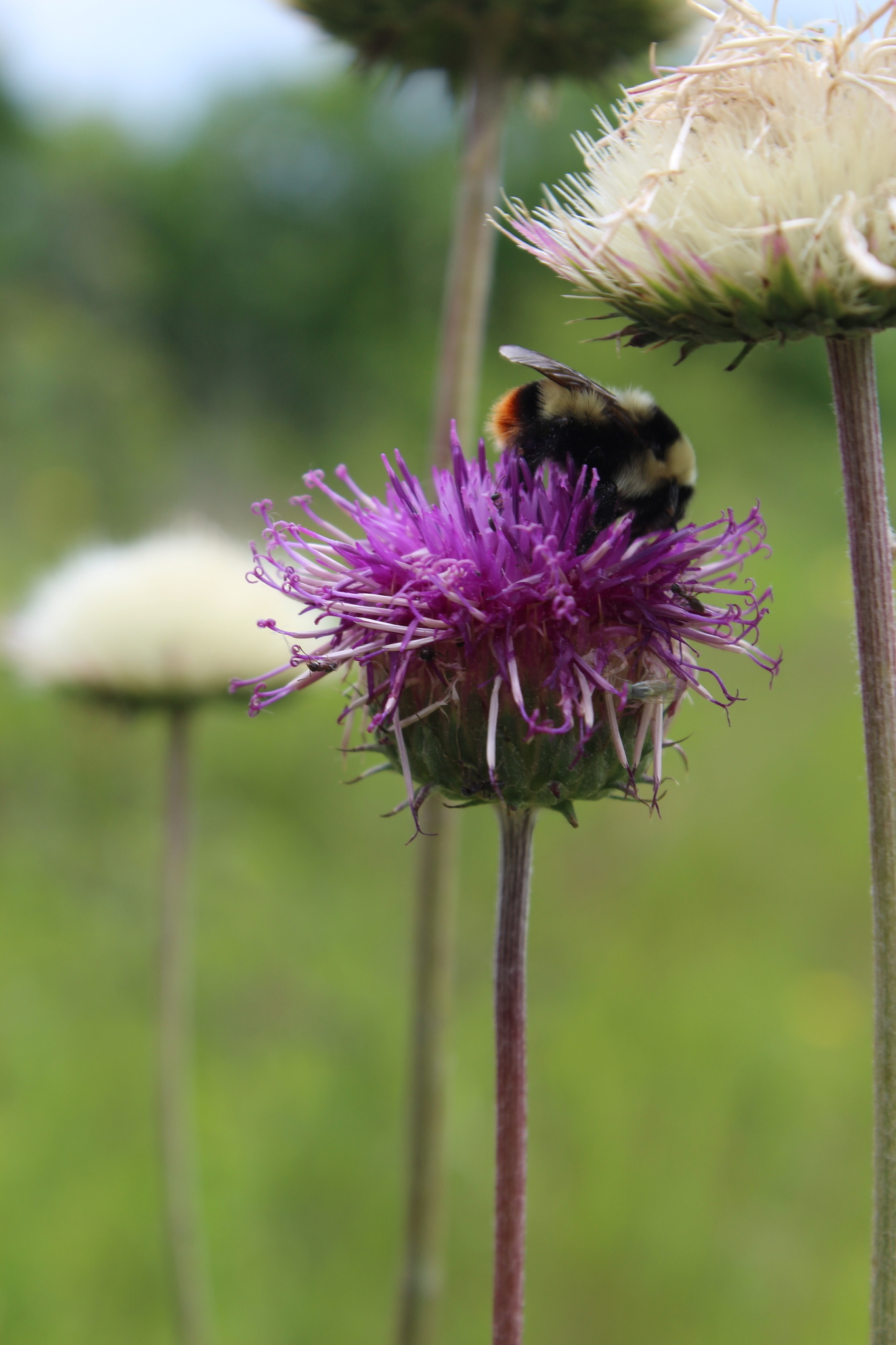
- Lipetsk Oblast, Russia, 2016

Scientific classification
- Domain: Eukaryota
- Kingdom: Animalia
- Phylum: Arthropoda
- Class: Insecta
- Order: Hymenoptera
- Family: Apidae
- Genus: Bombus
- Subgenus: Cullumanobombus
- Species: B. cullumanus

Binomial name
- Bombus cullumanus (Kirby, 1802)

= Bombus cullumanus =

Species of bee

Bombus cullumanus, Cullum's bumblebee or Cullum's humble-bee. is a species of bumblebee found in Europe and Asia.

== Description ==
The females (queen and workers) are black with red tails and usually with yellow hairs intermixed with the black on the collar and scutellum. The male is black with yellow face, the two anterior terga (abdominal segments) pale and with a red tail.

== Distribution ==
The species was once found in southern England, southern Sweden, Denmark, north-western Germany, the Netherlands, Belgium, and northern France. Its distribution has diminished considerably, and it is restricted to the Massif Central and the Pyrenees. Some scientists, however, claim that this species is conspecific with other, Asian bumblebees, as B. serrisquama and B. apollineus (B. cullumanus serrisquama and B. cullumanus apollineus, respectively, when considered subspecies of B. cullumanus). The distribution for B. c. serrisquama is large but spotty; from the steppe of northern Spain over Hungary to the northern Altai and in the south the steppes of south-east Kazakhstan, eastern Uzbekistan, Tadzhikistan, Kirgiztan, and Afghanistan. Recently (1998), it has been found in north-eastern Turkey. B. c. apollineus is found in eastern Turkey, Transcaucasia and northern Iran.

== Ecology ==
This bumblebee is predominantly a grassland species; the B. c. serrisquama subspecies, however, is a mountain bumblebee, living from 1,650 to 3,200 m (5,410 to 10,500 ft) above sea level.
