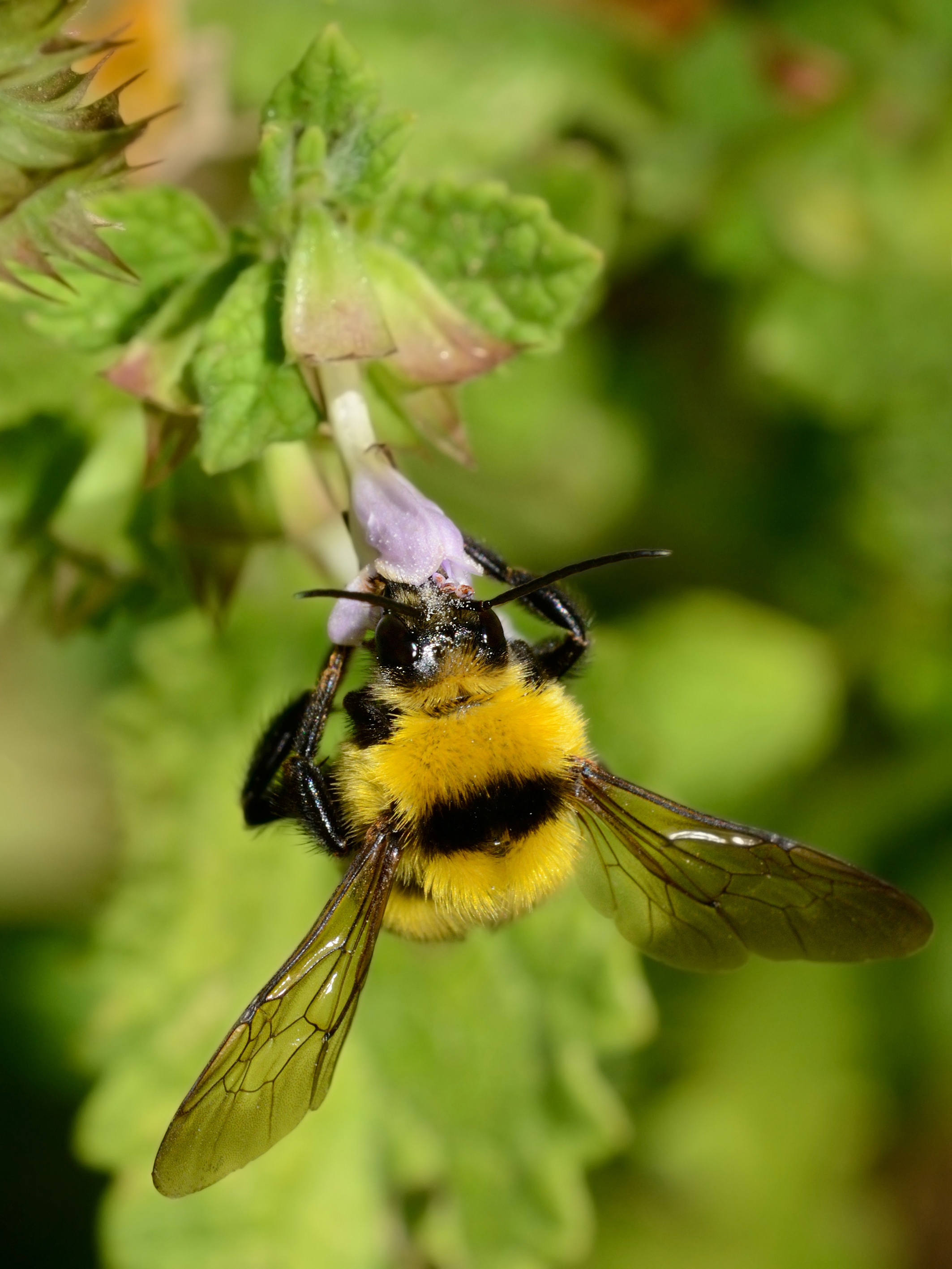

Scientific classification
- Domain: Eukaryota
- Kingdom: Animalia
- Phylum: Arthropoda
- Class: Insecta
- Order: Hymenoptera
- Family: Apidae
- Genus: Bombus
- Subgenus: Bombus (Megabombus)
- Species: B. argillaceus

Binomial name
- Bombus argillaceus (Scopoli, 1763)

= Bombus argillaceus =

Species of bee

Bombus argillaceus is a bumblebee species of the subgenus Megabombus, distributed from south and south-eastern Europe to western Asia.

== Description ==
A large bumblebee, the queen has a body length of 24 to 28 mm (0.94 to 1.10 in) with a long proboscis, a very oblong head and dark wings. The males and workers are considerably smaller than the queen. The thorax is yellow with a broad, median, black band. The abdomen of the queen is completely black, while the males and workers have the first tergite (abdominal segment) and the centre of the second yellow, the middle part black and the tail white, except the last tergite, which is black.

== Ecology ==
In Turkey, it lives in the mountains, usually at heights between 900 and 1,870 m (2,950 and 6,140 ft) above sea level. It has, however, been found as high as 2,855 m (9,367 ft).

Its major food sources are flowering plants from the Boraginaceae (forget-me-not family), Asteraceae (aster family), Lamiaceae (mint family), and Fabaceae (pea family).

== Distribution ==
B. argillaceus is found from the eastern Mediterranean to the Alps in France, Italy, Switzerland, and Austria, over Hungary north to Cluj in Romania. In the east, it reaches eastern Kazakhstan, and in the south and south-east the Balkans, Greece, Cyprus, Turkey, the Caucasus, and northern Iran.
