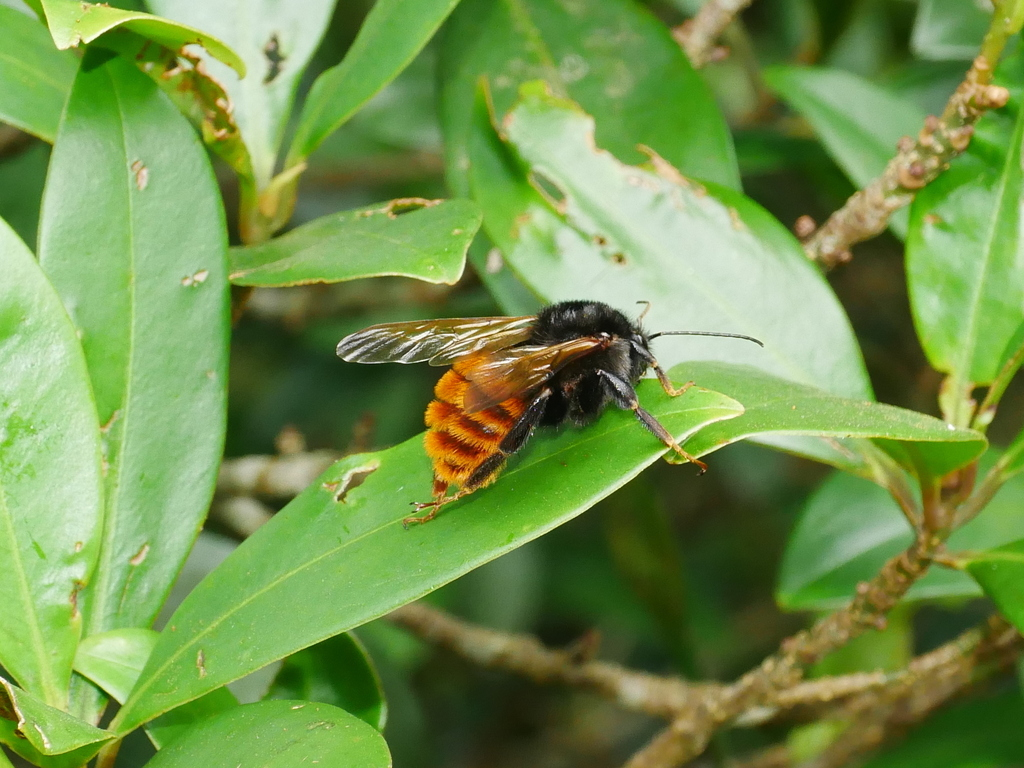

Scientific classification
- Kingdom: Animalia
- Phylum: Arthropoda
- Clade: Pancrustacea
- Class: Insecta
- Order: Hymenoptera
- Family: Apidae
- Genus: Bombus
- Subgenus: Bombus (Megabombus)
- Species: B. bicoloratus

Binomial name
- Bombus bicoloratus Smith, 1879

= Bombus bicoloratus =

Species of bee

Bombus bicoloratus is a species of bumblebee. It is native to southeast Asia, where it occurs primarily in southern China and Taiwan.

In China, this species is considered an important pollinator of crop and ornamental plants, including Capsicum annum, Helianthus annus, and Hosta ventricosa.

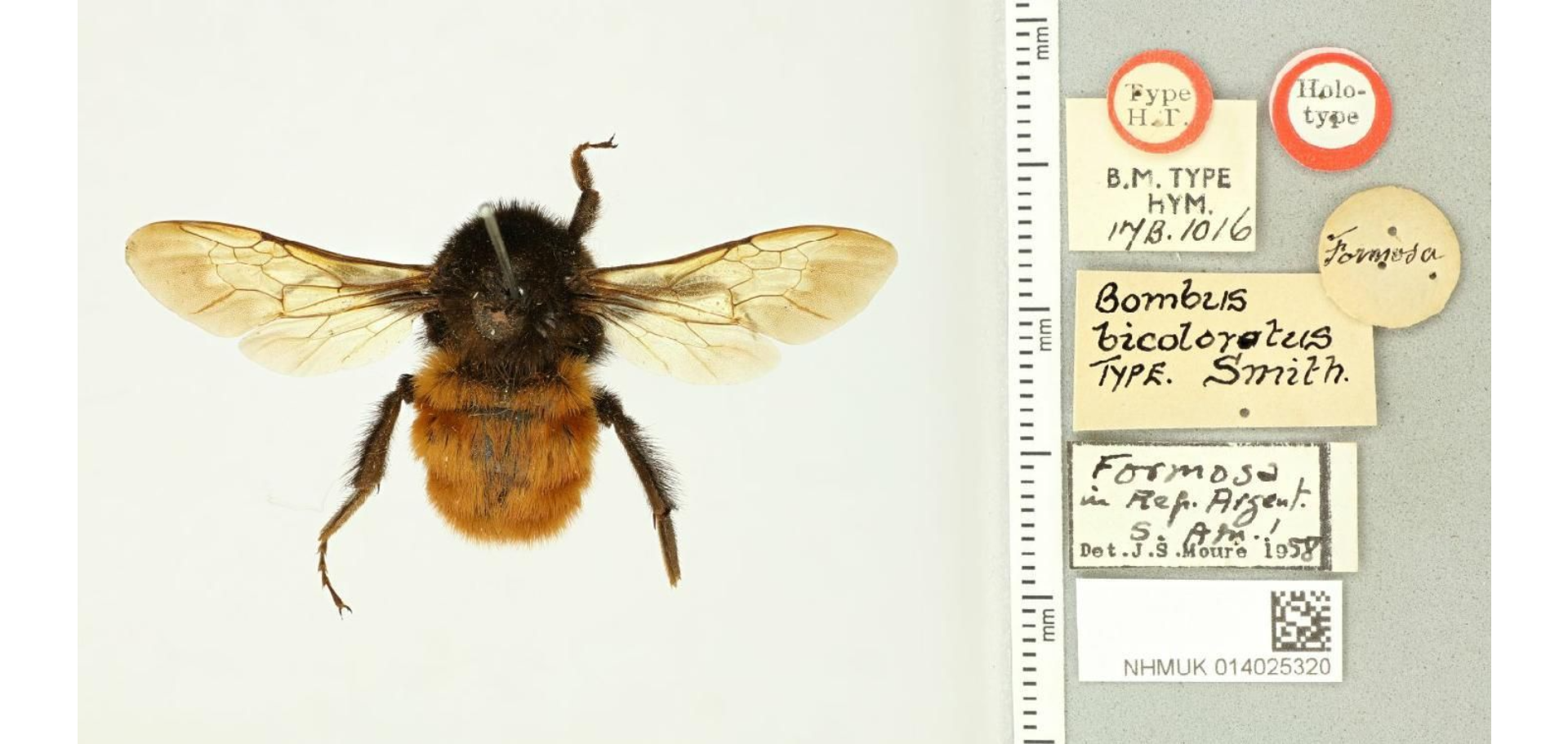
Type specimen of B. bicoloratus, held in the collections of the Natural History Museum, London.
