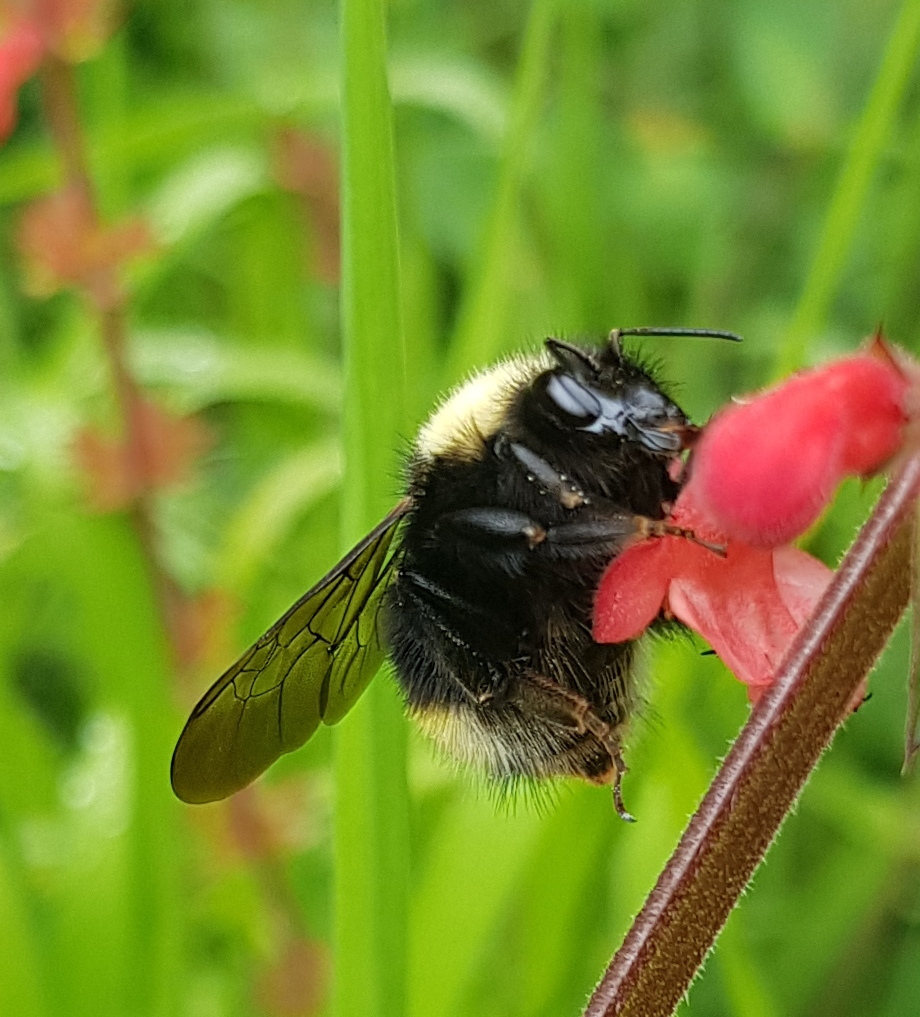

Conservation status
- Least Concern (IUCN 3.1)

Scientific classification
- Kingdom: Animalia
- Phylum: Arthropoda
- Class: Insecta
- Order: Hymenoptera
- Family: Apidae
- Genus: Bombus
- Subgenus: Thoracobombus
- Species: B. trinominatus

Binomial name
- Bombus trinominatus Dalla Torre, 1890

Synonyms
- Bombus modestus; Bombus xelajuensis

= Bombus trinominatus =

Species of bee

Bombus trinominatus is a species of bumblebee native to Mexico and Guatemala.

This bee occurs in mountainous regions above 2572 meters in elevation. It is strongly associated with pine-oak forest ecosystems. It is not thought to be in decline at this time, though some of its potential habitat is endangered.
