= Bombus erzurumensis =

Scientific classification
- Domain: Eukaryota
- Kingdom: Animalia
- Phylum: Arthropoda
- Class: Insecta
- Order: Hymenoptera
- Family: Apidae
- Genus: Bombus
- Subgenus: Melanobombus
- Species: B. erzurumensis

Binomial name
- Bombus erzurumensis (Özbek, 1990)

Species of bee

Bombus erzurumensis is a species of bumblebee found in Turkey (north-eastern Anatolia) and northern Iran.

== Description ==
The thorax is whitish with a black band between the wings. The two first terga (abdominal segments) are white, followed by a black band; the rest of the abdomen is red. Variation in the pattern is considerable, but the form B. erzurumensis f. oezbeki (earlier considered a separate species, B. oezbeki) has white fur on the face and the corbiculae (pollen basket) is covered with red hairs.

== Ecology ==
Bombus erzurumensis is a mountain species, living on alpine steppes between 1,550 and 3,000 m (5,090 and 9,840 ft) above sea level. It collects nectar and pollen from flowering plants, for example, Cephalaria, Campanula, Jurinea, and Nepeta species.
