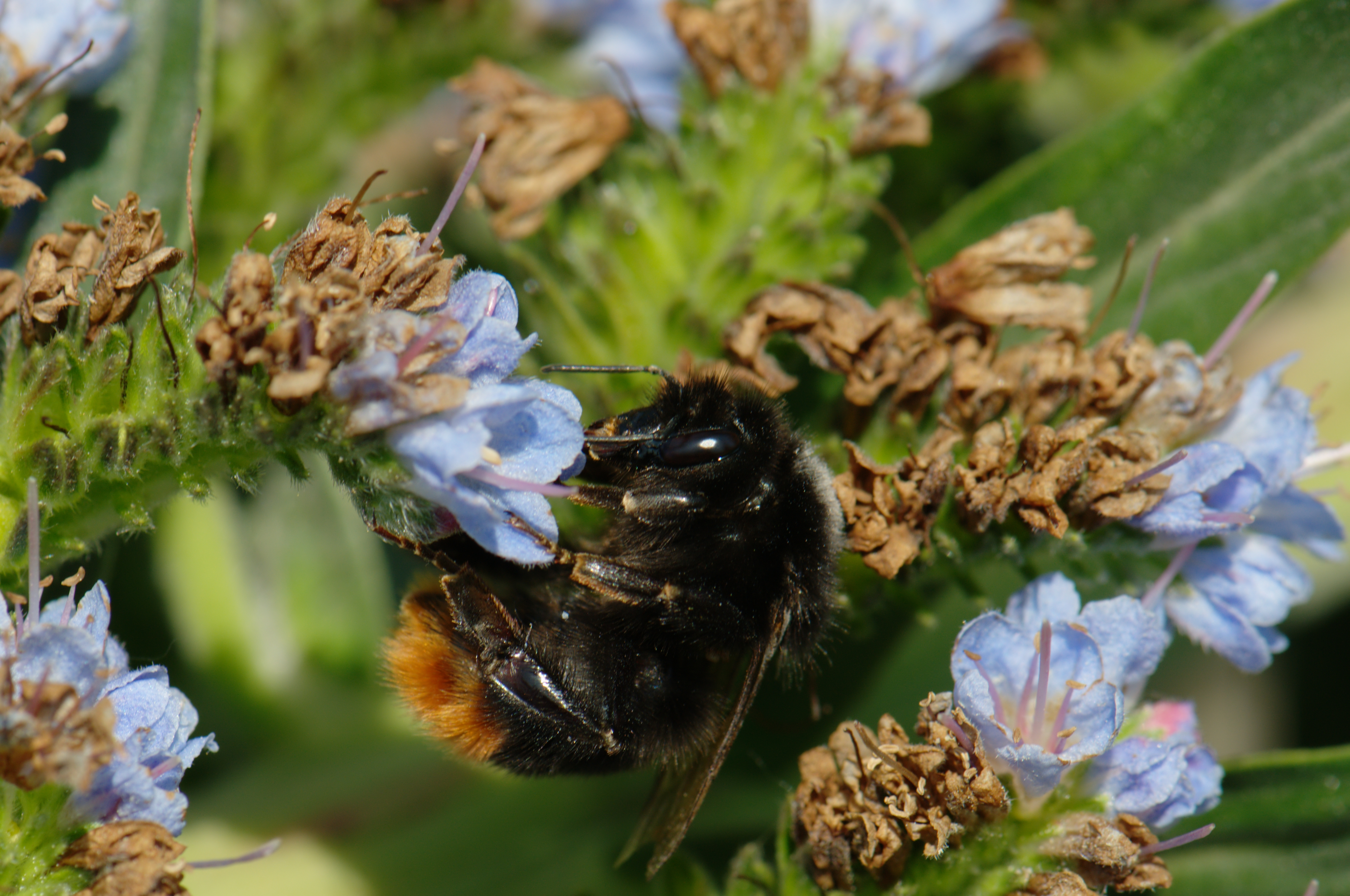
- Bombus confusus male

Scientific classification
- Domain: Eukaryota
- Kingdom: Animalia
- Phylum: Arthropoda
- Class: Insecta
- Order: Hymenoptera
- Family: Apidae
- Genus: Bombus
- Subgenus: Bombias
- Species: B. confusus

Binomial name
- Bombus confusus Schenck, 1859

= Bombus confusus =

Species of bee

Bombus confusus is a species of bumblebee found in Austria, Belgium, the Czech Republic, France, Germany, Hungary, Lithuania, Latvia, Poland, Romania, Slovakia, Slovenia, Spain, and Switzerland.

== Appearance ==
The functional morphology of Bombus confusus has been investigated (as well as others), and found that the males have enlarged eyes and a frontal zone with enlarged facets. This can be associated with improved spatial resolution and contrast sensitivity, all of which connect to the mating of the males.

== Reproduction ==
Visual search for females was thought to be the only observed pre-mating behavior in Bombus confusus. Studies confirm that alongside visual search, labial gland secretion is also used to attract females.
