= Bombus macgregori =

Conservation status
- Least Concern (IUCN 3.1)

Scientific classification
- Domain: Eukaryota
- Kingdom: Animalia
- Phylum: Arthropoda
- Class: Insecta
- Order: Hymenoptera
- Family: Apidae
- Genus: Bombus
- Subgenus: Cullumanobombus
- Species: B. macgregori

Binomial name
- Bombus macgregori Labougle & Ayala, 1985

Synonyms
- Bombus menchuae; Bombus rasmonti

Species of bee

Bombus macgregori is a species of bumblebee native to Mexico and Guatemala.

This bee was described to science in 1985 from a specimen collected in the state of Guerrero.

The queen is about 2 centimeters long. The head is black with a few white hairs. The body is all black except for the tip of the abdomen, which is white. The worker is similar in appearance but is only about 1.1 centimeters long. The male is about 1.6 centimeters long and mostly black in color with areas of gray and red.

This species was described as the first member of the subgenus Dasybombus, which was characterized by the unique morphology of the male genitalia. This taxon is now obsolete and the bee is a member of the subgenus Cullumanobombus.

This bee lives in coniferous and deciduous mountain forests.

In general, this is an uncommon to rare species, but it is not facing severe declines. Potential threats include habitat degradation and destruction, especially by agricultural operations such as tree plantations and livestock farming, and associated pollution. Other threats include mining, spreading of human settlements, and landslides on the local mountain slopes.
