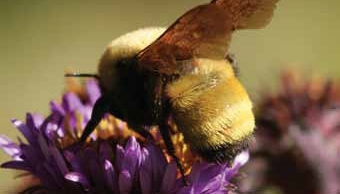

Conservation status
- Vulnerable (IUCN 3.1)

Scientific classification
- Domain: Eukaryota
- Kingdom: Animalia
- Phylum: Arthropoda
- Class: Insecta
- Order: Hymenoptera
- Family: Apidae
- Genus: Bombus
- Subgenus: Cullumanobombus
- Species: B. morrisoni

Binomial name
- Bombus morrisoni Cresson, 1878

= Bombus morrisoni =

Species of bee

Bombus morrisoni is a species of bumblebee. It is native to western North America, including the western United States and British Columbia. It is known commonly as the Morrison bumblebee.

This bee lives in open scrub habitat. It nests underground and aboveground in structures and grass hummocks. It feeds at many kinds of plants, including milkweed, milkvetch, rabbitbrush, thistles, bee plants, goldenbushes, sunflowers, and goldenrods. It is an important pollinator of alfalfa in some areas.

This species has faced some declines, and has not been found recently in several well-sampled areas in its range. It is secure and common in other areas.
