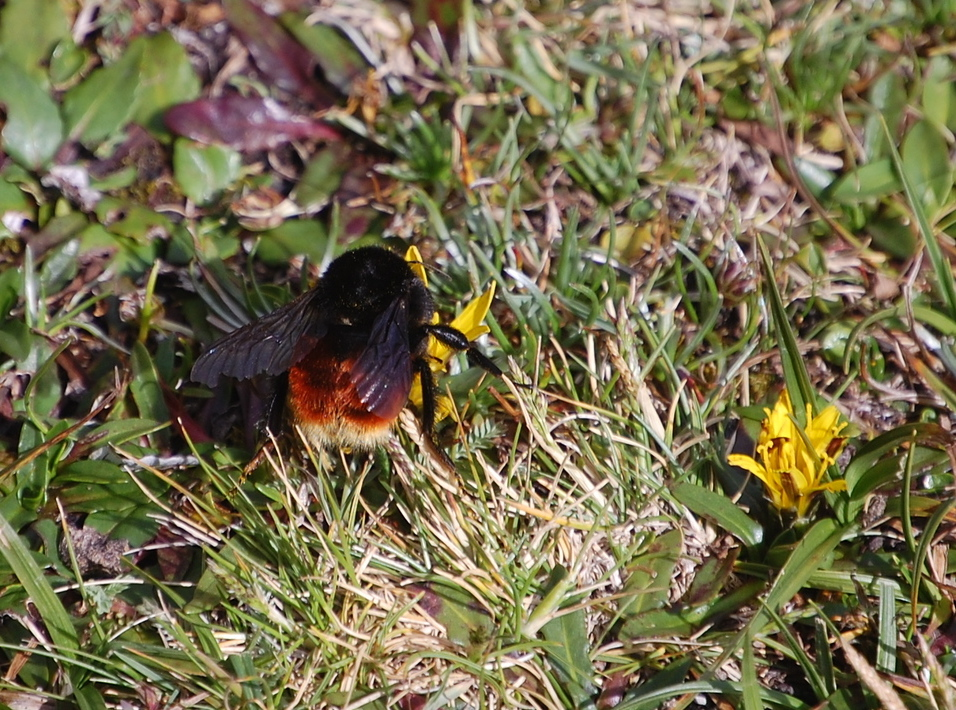

Scientific classification
- Domain: Eukaryota
- Kingdom: Animalia
- Phylum: Arthropoda
- Class: Insecta
- Order: Hymenoptera
- Family: Apidae
- Genus: Bombus
- Subgenus: Cullumanobombus
- Species: B. coccineus

Binomial name
- Bombus coccineus Friese, 1903

= Bombus coccineus =

Species of bumblebee

Bombus coccineus, also known by its common name scarlet-tailed bumble bee, is a species from the subgenus Cullumanobombus. The species was first described in 1903.
