= Bombus skorikovi =

Scientific classification
- Domain: Eukaryota
- Kingdom: Animalia
- Phylum: Arthropoda
- Class: Insecta
- Order: Hymenoptera
- Family: Apidae
- Genus: Bombus
- Subgenus: Psithyrus
- Species: B. skorikovi

Binomial name
- Bombus skorikovi (Popov, 1927)

Species of bee

Bombus skorikovi is a species of cuckoo bumblebee.
