= Bombus coreanus =

Scientific classification
- Domain: Eukaryota
- Kingdom: Animalia
- Phylum: Arthropoda
- Class: Insecta
- Order: Hymenoptera
- Family: Apidae
- Genus: Bombus
- Subgenus: Psithyrus
- Species: B. coreanus

Binomial name
- Bombus coreanus (Yasumatsu, 1934)

Species of bee

Bombus coreanus is a species of cuckoo bumblebee.
