= Bombus morawitzianus =

Scientific classification
- Domain: Eukaryota
- Kingdom: Animalia
- Phylum: Arthropoda
- Class: Insecta
- Order: Hymenoptera
- Family: Apidae
- Genus: Bombus
- Subgenus: Psithyrus
- Species: B. morawitzianus

Binomial name
- Bombus morawitzianus (Popov, 1931)

Species of bee

Bombus morawitzianus is a species of cuckoo bumblebee.
