= Bombus bellardii =

Scientific classification
- Kingdom: Animalia
- Phylum: Arthropoda
- Class: Insecta
- Order: Hymenoptera
- Family: Apidae
- Genus: Bombus
- Subgenus: Psithyrus
- Species: B. bellardii

Binomial name
- Bombus bellardii (Gribodo, 1892)

Species of bee

Bombus bellardii is a species of cuckoo bumblebee.

== Synonyms (Heterotypic) ==
- Psithyrus pieli Maa, 1948
- Psithyrus tajushanensis Pittioni, 1949
