= Bombus expolitus =

Scientific classification
- Domain: Eukaryota
- Kingdom: Animalia
- Phylum: Arthropoda
- Class: Insecta
- Order: Hymenoptera
- Family: Apidae
- Genus: Bombus
- Subgenus: Psithyrus
- Species: B. expolitus

Binomial name
- Bombus expolitus (Tkalcu, 1989)

Synonyms
- Psithyrus expolitus

Species of bee

Bombus expolitus is a species of cuckoo bumblebee.
