= Bombus sibiricus =

Scientific classification
- Domain: Eukaryota
- Kingdom: Animalia
- Phylum: Arthropoda
- Class: Insecta
- Order: Hymenoptera
- Family: Apidae
- Genus: Bombus
- Species: B. sibiricus

Binomial name
- Bombus sibiricus (Fabricius, 1781)

Species of bee

Bombus sibiricus is a species of bumblebee in the genus Bombus described by Johan Christian Fabricius in 1781.

== Range ==
Bombus sibiricus lives across Asia, but is most commonly found in Southern Russia (near Lake Baikal), Mongolia and Northern China.

== Feeding ==
Bombus sibiricus, just like other bumblebees, are pollinators and they feed on nectar and pollen. Bumblebees have a long hairy tongue which they use to consume the liquid inside the flower.

== Description ==
Bombus sibiricus is black, yellow and orange. They usually have black stripes, legs, head and underbelly, an orange thorax and the tip of the abdomen and everything else is usually yellow.

== Similar species ==
A species of stiletto fly called Sinethereva shangui uses its appearance to fool predators into believing that it is a bumblebee. This species primarily mimics nearby bumblebee species such as Bombus sibiricus and Bombus hypnorum.
