= Bombus maxillosus =

Scientific classification
- Domain: Eukaryota
- Kingdom: Animalia
- Phylum: Arthropoda
- Class: Insecta
- Order: Hymenoptera
- Family: Apidae
- Genus: Bombus
- Subgenus: Psithyrus
- Species: B. maxillosus

Binomial name
- Bombus maxillosus Klug, 1817

Synonyms
- Psithyrus maxillosus (Klug, 1817)

Species of bee

Bombus maxillosus is a species of cuckoo bumblebee found in Austria, the Czech Republic, France, Hungary, Italy, Romania, Slovakia, Spain, and Switzerland. They have also been located in Zanjan where the DNA of these unlikely species are being collected and tested. B. maxillosus is considered a rare species of the cuckoo bumblebee. The B. maxillosus is an open field species and is also sometimes classified as a wood edge species.

== Pheromones ==
The only known reports of the Bombus maxillosus came from Scandinavian populations. This species was then further studied in Czech Republic. Below is a chart from the marking pheromone study conducted by the Academy of Sciences of the Czech Republic. It is reported that this is the first time B. maxillosus was studied and they found 62 compounds within the labial gland.

Compounds	Molecular weight	DMDS fragments, m/z	Median (%, N=4)
Aliphatic alcohols
Hexadecen-1-ola	240	Adduct not found	<0.1
Hexadecan-1-ol	242		<0.1
Octadec-11-en-1-ol	268	145, 217, 362	14.2
Octadecan-1-ol	270		0.7
Icos-13-en-1-ol	296	145, 245, 390	4.7
Icos-11-en-1-ol	296	173, 217, 390	Trace
Docos-13-en-1-ol	324	173, 245	Trace
Aliphatic aldehydes
Octadec-11-enal	266	145, 215, 360	<0.1
Fatty acids
Decanoic acid	172		<0.1
Dodecanoic acid	200		0.9
Tetradecanoic acid	228		<0.1
Hexadecenoic acida	254	Adduct not found	<0.1
Aliphatic esters
Methyl dodecanoate	214		<0.1
Octadec-11-enyl acetate	310	145, 259, 404	1.4
Icosen-11-yl acetate	338	173, 259	0.2
Octadecenyl dodecanoatea	450	Adduct not found	1.7
Octadecenyl tetradecenoatea	476	Adduct not found	0.3
1,3-Diacetyl-2-decanoylglycerol	330		1.7
1,3-Diacetyl-2-dodecanoylglycerol	358		24.7
1,3-Diacetyl-2-tetradecanoylglycerol	386		1.1
1,3-Diacetyl-2-tetradecenoylglycerola	384	Adduct not found	0.1
1,3-Diacetyl-2-hexadecenoylglycerola	412	Adduct not found	<0.1
Isoprenoids
Citronellol	156		<0.1
Citronellyl acetate	198		0.1
Geranyl acetate	196		<0.1
Geranylacetone	194		0.1
Dihydrofarnesol	224		0.1
Farnesol	222		1.5
Farnesal	220		0.2
Dihydrofarnesyl acetate	266		0.5
Farnesyl acetate	264		25.1
Farnesyl butyrate	292		<0.1
Geranylcitronellol	292		5.7
Geranylgeranial	288		0.4
Geranylcitronellyl acetate	334		1.0
Geranylgeranyl acetate	332		0.5
Farnesyl decanoate	376		<0.1
Farnesyl dodecanoate	404		0.3
Hydrocarbons
Undecane	156		<0.1
Dodecane	170		<0.1
Tridecane	184		<0.1
Tetradecane	198		0.1
Pentadecane	212		<0.1
Hexadecane	226		0.1
Henicos-9-ene	294	173, 215	Trace
Henicosane	296		0.2
Tricos-7-ene	322	145, 271	Trace
Tricosane	324		3.9
Tetracosane	338		<0.1
Pentacos-9-ene	350	173, 271	0.2
Pentacos-7-ene	350	145, 299	<0.1
Pentacosane	352		1.0
Hexacosenea	364	Adduct not found	<0.1
Hexacosane	366		<0.1
Heptacos-9-ene	378	173, 271	<0.1
Heptacos-7-ene	378	145, 327	0.6
Heptacosane	380		0.5
Nonacosenea	406	Adduct not found	<0.1
Nonacosenea	406	Adduct not found	<0.1
Nonacosane	408		<0.1
Hentriacontenea	434	Adduct not found	<0.1
