= Bombus novus =

Scientific classification
- Kingdom: Animalia
- Phylum: Arthropoda
- Clade: Pancrustacea
- Class: Insecta
- Order: Hymenoptera
- Family: Apidae
- Genus: Bombus
- Subgenus: Psithyrus
- Species: B. novus

Binomial name
- Bombus novus (Frison, 1933)

Species of bee

Bombus novus is a species of cuckoo bumblebee.
