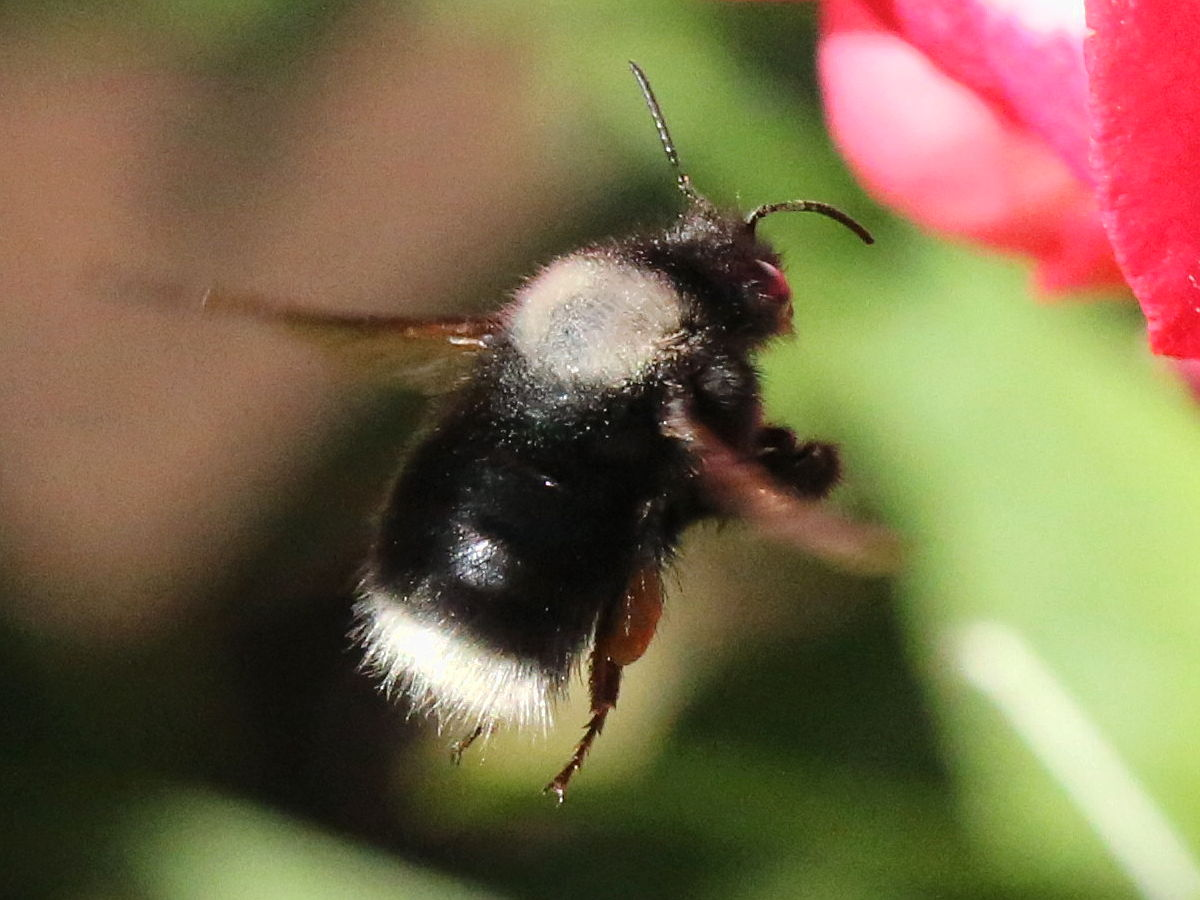
- In flight

Scientific classification
- Domain: Eukaryota
- Kingdom: Animalia
- Phylum: Arthropoda
- Class: Insecta
- Order: Hymenoptera
- Family: Apidae
- Genus: Bombus
- Species: B. funebris

Binomial name
- Bombus funebris (Smith, 1854)

= Bombus funebris =

Species of insect

Bombus funebris, the mourning bee, is a species of bumblebee found in South America west of the Andes, from Colombia to northern Chile.

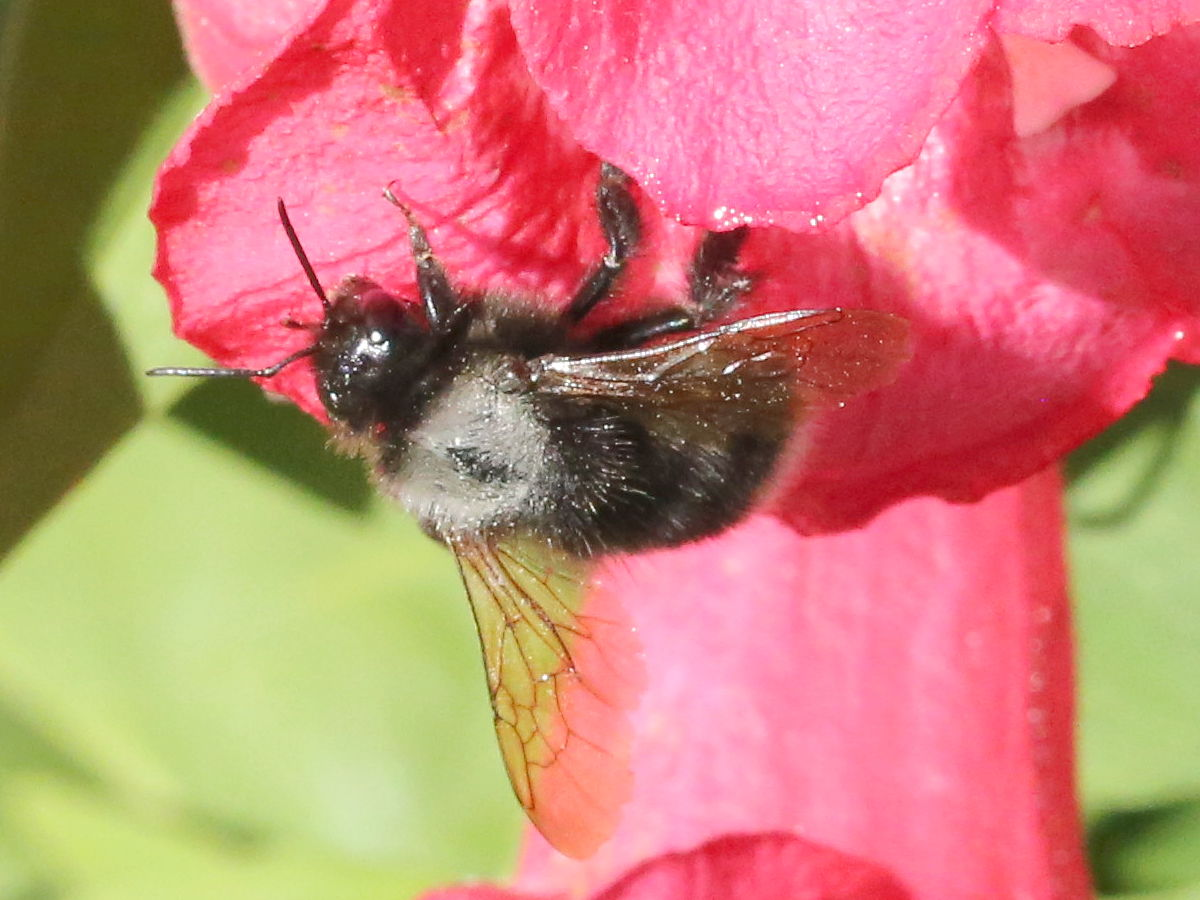
Nectaring in Cusco, Peru

== Original publication ==
Catalogue of hymenopterous insects in the collection of the British Museum, vol. 2.
