= Bombus chinensis =

Scientific classification
- Domain: Eukaryota
- Kingdom: Animalia
- Phylum: Arthropoda
- Class: Insecta
- Order: Hymenoptera
- Family: Apidae
- Genus: Bombus
- Subgenus: Psithyrus
- Species: B. chinensis

Binomial name
- Bombus chinensis (Morawitz, 1890)

Species of bee

Bombus chinensis is a species of cuckoo bumblebee. It is one the endemic pollinators of China, where its populations have been decreasing.
