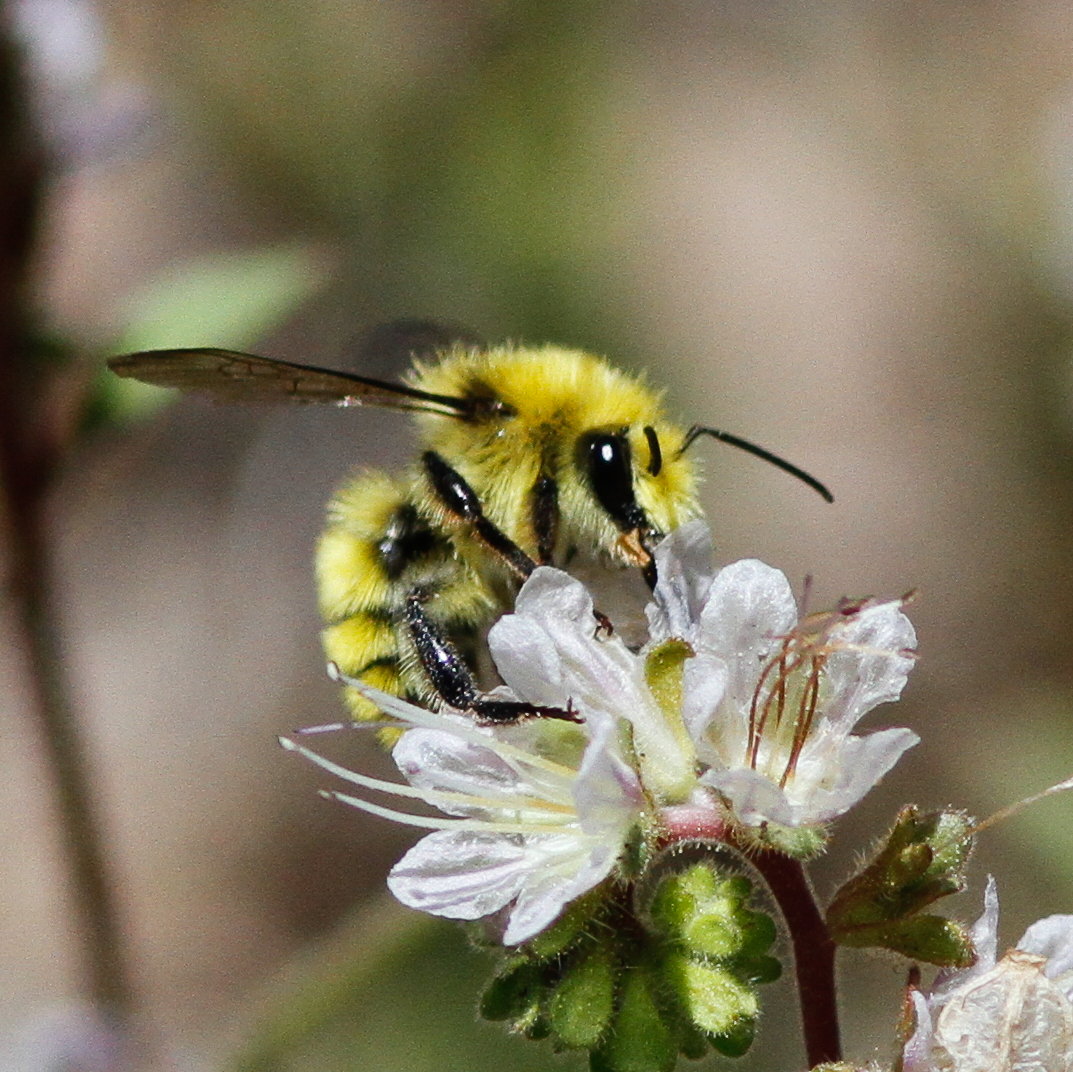
- El Dorado County, 2023

Conservation status
- Least Concern (IUCN 3.1)

Scientific classification
- Kingdom: Animalia
- Phylum: Arthropoda
- Class: Insecta
- Order: Hymenoptera
- Family: Apidae
- Genus: Bombus
- Species: B. vandykei

Binomial name
- Bombus vandykei (Frison, 1927)

= Bombus vandykei =

Species of bee

Bombus vandykei, the Van Dyke's bumblebee, is a species of bumble bees in the family Apidae. It is found in North America.

The IUCN conservation status of Bombus vandykei is "LC", least concern, with no immediate threat to the species' survival. The population is stable.
