= Bombus perezi =

Conservation status
- Least Concern (IUCN 3.1)

Scientific classification
- Kingdom: Animalia
- Phylum: Arthropoda
- Class: Insecta
- Order: Hymenoptera
- Family: Apidae
- Genus: Bombus
- Subgenus: Psithyrus
- Species: B. perezi

Binomial name
- Bombus perezi Schulthess-Rechberg, 1886

Species of bee

Bombus perezi is a species of bumblebee native to the islands of Corsica and Elba. It is also reported from Greece.

This is a cuckoo bumblebee, one that lives in the nest of another bee. One host for this species is likely the buff-tailed bumblebee (B. terrestris).
