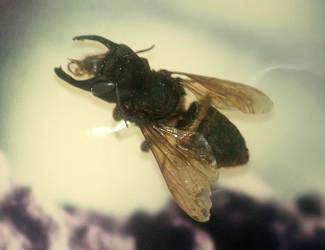
- Female Megachile pluto

Scientific classification
- Kingdom: Animalia
- Phylum: Arthropoda
- Clade: Pancrustacea
- Class: Insecta
- Order: Hymenoptera
- Family: Megachilidae
- Genus: Megachile
- Subgenus: Callomegachile; Michener, 1962

= Callomegachile =

Subgenus of leafcutter bees (Megachile)

Callomegachile is a subgenus of the bee genus Megachile in the family Megachilidae.

== Species ==
- Megachile albobasalis
- Megachile alboscopacea
- Megachile ambigua
- Megachile anomomaculata
- Megachile antinorii
- Megachile apoicola
- Megachile ardens
- Megachile arnoldiella
- Megachile aterrima
- Megachile atratiformis
- Megachile badia
- Megachile bigibbosa
- Megachile bilobata
- Megachile binghami
- Megachile biroi
- Megachile biseta
- Megachile breviceps
- Megachile carinifrons
- Megachile cephalotes
- Megachile cheesmanae
- Megachile chrysorrhoea
- Megachile cincturata
- Megachile clio
- Megachile concolor
- Megachile davaonensis
- Megachile demeter
- Megachile devexa
- Megachile disjuncta
- Megachile disjunctiformis
- Megachile esora
- Megachile eurycephala
- Megachile eximia
- Megachile faceta
- Megachile facetula
- Megachile finschi
- Megachile flavipennis
- Megachile fulvipennis
- Megachile funeraria
- Megachile gigantea
- Megachile gigas
- Megachile godeffroyi
- Megachile hertlei
- Megachile impressa
- Megachile incisa
- Megachile indonesica
- Megachile ingens
- Megachile invenita
- Megachile kamerunensis
- Megachile kuehni
- Megachile laboriosa
- Megachile lateritia
- Megachile lerma
- Megachile leucospila
- Megachile luangwae
- Megachile luteiceps
- Megachile malayana
- Megachile mcnamarae
- Megachile mefistofelica
- Megachile memecylonae
- Megachile mendanae
- Megachile meneliki
- Megachile moelleri
- Megachile montibia
- Megachile monticola
- Megachile mortyana
- Megachile mystaceana
- Megachile nidulator
- Megachile nitidiscutata
- Megachile obrepta
- Megachile odontophora
- Megachile orthostoma
- Megachile osea
- Megachile paucipunctulata
- Megachile pluto
- Megachile pretiosa
- Megachile punctolineata
- Megachile ramakrishnae
- Megachile rambutwan
- Megachile rangii
- Megachile relata
- Megachile rhyssalus
- Megachile rotundiceps
- Megachile rufipennis
- Megachile rufipes
- Megachile rufiventris
- Megachile sculpturalis
- Megachile sheppardi
- Megachile simonyi
- Megachile soutpansbergensis
- Megachile stirostoma
- Megachile strupigera
- Megachile szentivanyi
- Megachile terminalis
- Megachile tertia
- Megachile timorensis
- Megachile tomentosa
- Megachile transiens
- Megachile truncaticeps
- Megachile trusanica
- Megachile umbripennis
- Megachile utra
- Megachile viridinitens
