= Bombus kashmirensis =

Scientific classification
- Kingdom: Animalia
- Phylum: Arthropoda
- Class: Insecta
- Order: Hymenoptera
- Family: Apidae
- Genus: Bombus
- Subgenus: Alpigenobombus
- Species: B. kashmirensis

Binomial name
- Bombus kashmirensis Friese, 1909

Synonyms
- Bombus mastrucatus subsp. kashmirensis Friese, 1909 Bombus mastrucatus subsp. stramineus Friese, 1909 Bombus tetrachromus Cockerell, 1909 Alpigenobombus pulcherrimus Skorikov, 1914 Bombus (Mastrucatobombus) mastrucatus subsp. meinertzhageni Richards, 1928 Alpigenobombus pulcherrimus var. albidocaudatus Skorikov, 1914

Species of bee

Bombus kashmirensis is a high-altitude bumblebee species native to the Himalaya and Hengduan mountain ranges.

== Appearance ==
Females have wings that are nearly clear with dark brown veins. Their body hair is medium to long. The oculo-malar area (the space between the eye and the mandible) is shorter than it is broad. The clypeus (the front part of the face) is slightly raised in the center, interrupting the transverse groove. The hair on the side of the thorax and the scutellum is either white or yellow. A key identifying feature is the hair on the fifth abdominal segment, which is orange with distinctive white tips.

Males also have nearly clear wings with dark brown veins and medium to long hair. A notable characteristic is that the male eye is distinctly enlarged compared to the female eye. The male genitalia have a long gonostylus that is convexly rounded at the tip, and a strongly recurved penis-valve head that forms a broad hook. The hair on the side of the thorax is yellow or white, extending to the midleg bases. The third abdominal segment is usually predominantly black, and the sides of fifth and sixth segments have orange hair at the base with white tips.

In the wetter southern and eastern parts of its range, it has a white-banded pattern to mimic the abundant B. rufofasciatus and B. prshewalskyi. In the more arid north-western parts (the trans-Himalaya), it has a yellow-banded pattern to mimic the common local species B. keriensis.

== Distribution ==
B. kashmirensis is found in the high mountains of Pakistan, India, Nepal, and China (Tibet, Qinghai, Sichuan, Gansu). It has been recorded at elevations from 2,272 meters up to an impressive 4,800 meters. It lives primarily above the tree line in the alpine zone and can even be found in the semi-arid trans-Himalaya. Queens have been observed foraging on flowers at 4,000 meters in heavy snowfall, demonstrating their hardiness.
