= Megachile kigonserana =

Scientific classification
- Domain: Eukaryota
- Kingdom: Animalia
- Phylum: Arthropoda
- Class: Insecta
- Order: Hymenoptera
- Family: Megachilidae
- Genus: Megachile
- Species: M. kigonserana

Binomial name
- Megachile kigonserana Friese, 1903

Species of bee

Megachile kigonserana is a species of bee in the family Megachilidae. It was described by Friese in 1903.
