= Bombus angustus =

Scientific classification
- Kingdom: Animalia
- Phylum: Arthropoda
- Clade: Pancrustacea
- Class: Insecta
- Order: Hymenoptera
- Family: Apidae
- Genus: Bombus
- Subgenus: Alpigenobombus
- Species: B. angustus

Binomial name
- Bombus angustus Chiu, 1948
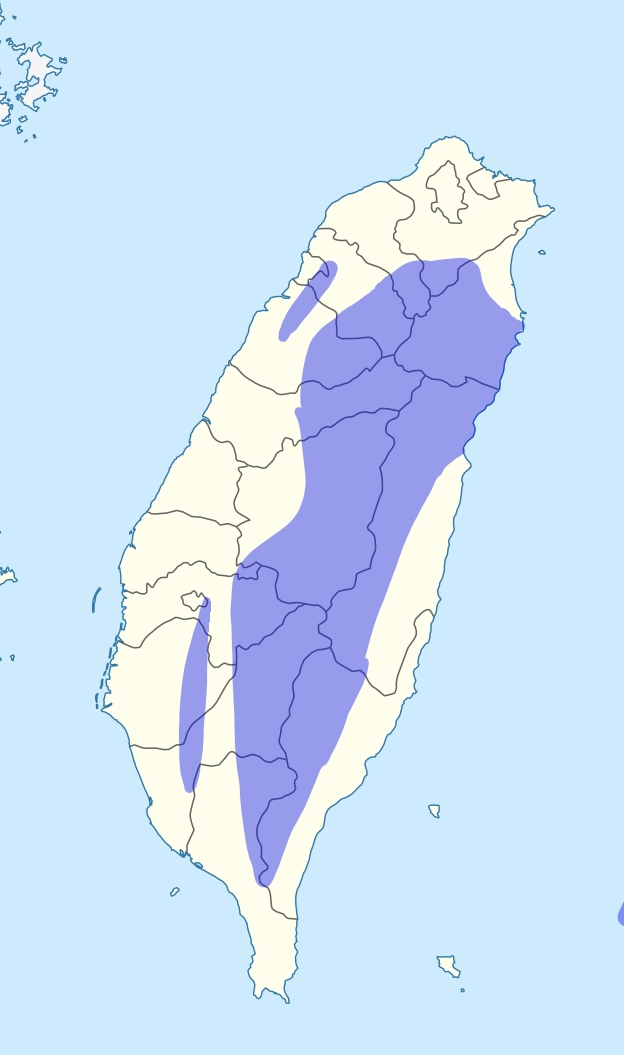

Species of bee

Bombus angustus is a species of bumblebee found in Taiwan.

== Appearance ==
Female : Females have wings that are very weakly clouded with brown, appearing nearly clear, complemented by dark brown veins. The body hair is of medium length. The oculo-malar area (the space between the eye and the mandible) is shorter than it is broad. The clypeus (the front part of the face) has a central area characterized by many small punctures. The exoskeleton and hair on the mid and hind tibiae are predominantly black. The hair on the thoracic dorsum (top of the thorax) and the first three tergites is black. The posterior tergites are a distinctive orange-red. The female mandible has been documented in scientific imagery.

Male : Males also possess nearly clear, very weakly clouded wings, but with light brown veins. The male genitalia are distinctive, the gonostylus is nearly equally short on both its outer and inner sides, but features a distal lobe that projects inwards as a long, broadly triangular, and pointed process. The hair on the thoracic dorsum and tergites is black, though the type specimen has faded to brown in parts. The posterior tergites are orange-red.

Bombus angustus exhibits no substantial color-pattern variation across its population. Its consistent appearance features a black body with a contrasting red-tailed metasoma. This specific color pattern is interpreted as a form of Batesian mimicry, where it mimics the commoner local bumblebee, B. trifasciatus, likely to gain protection from predators.

== Distribution ==
This species is endemic to the mountains of Taiwan including : Central Mountain Range, Xueshan Range, Yushan NP and others.
