= Megachile angulata =

Scientific classification
- Domain: Eukaryota
- Kingdom: Animalia
- Phylum: Arthropoda
- Class: Insecta
- Order: Hymenoptera
- Family: Megachilidae
- Genus: Megachile
- Species: M. angulata

Binomial name
- Megachile angulata Smith, 1853

Synonyms
- Megachile mandibulata Smith, 1853; Megachile hopilitis Vachal, 1903; Megachile hoplitis Vachal, 1903 (Misspelling); Megachile triangulifera Friese, 1904; Megachile elegans Friese, 1922; Megachile arnoldiana Brauns, 1926; Megachile vanderysti Cockerell, 1935; Megachile triangulifera kivuicola Cockerell, 1937; Megachile heptadonta Cockerell, 1937; Megachile elegantior Cockerell, 1937; Megachile nyangwensis Cockerell, 1939

Species of leafcutter bee (Megachile)

Megachile angulata is a species of bee in the family Megachilidae. It was described by Frederick Smith in 1853.
