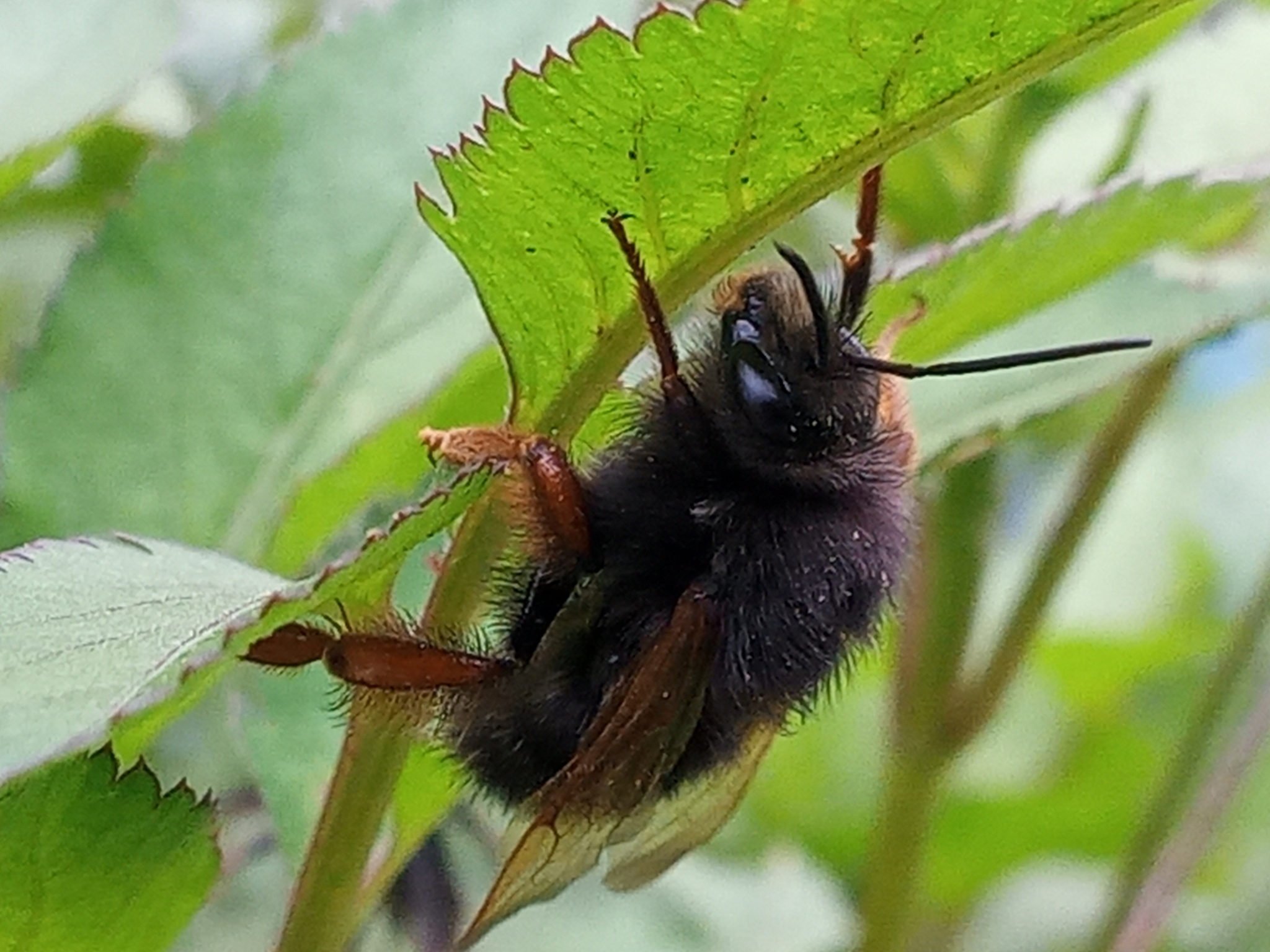

Scientific classification
- Kingdom: Animalia
- Phylum: Arthropoda
- Class: Insecta
- Order: Hymenoptera
- Family: Apidae
- Genus: Bombus
- Subgenus: Alpigenobombus
- Species: B. genalis

Binomial name
- Bombus genalis Friese, 1918
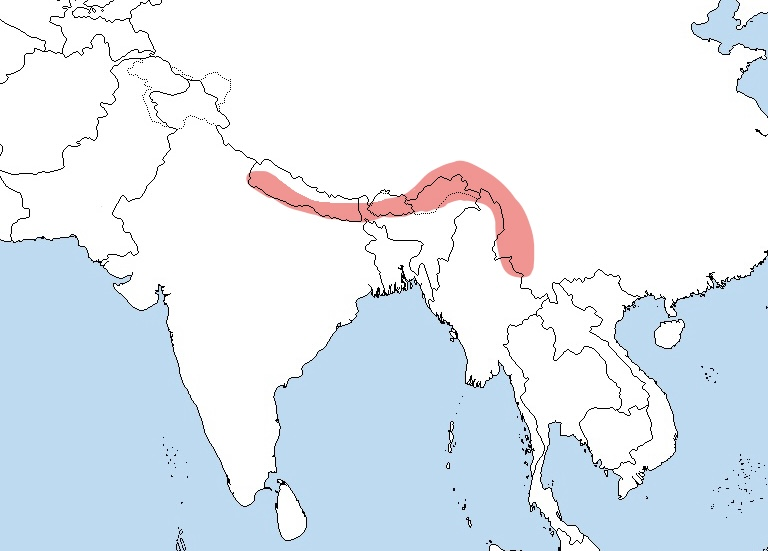

= Bombus genalis =

Species of bee

Bombus genalis, also known as Genal Bumblebee, is a species of bumblebee found primarily in Himalayas, a small part of Southeast Asia and China.

== Distribution ==
This species is present in Bhutan, China (Yunnan, Tibet), India (West Bengal, Assam) and Nepal. Its range is also likely extended into northeastern Myanmar.
