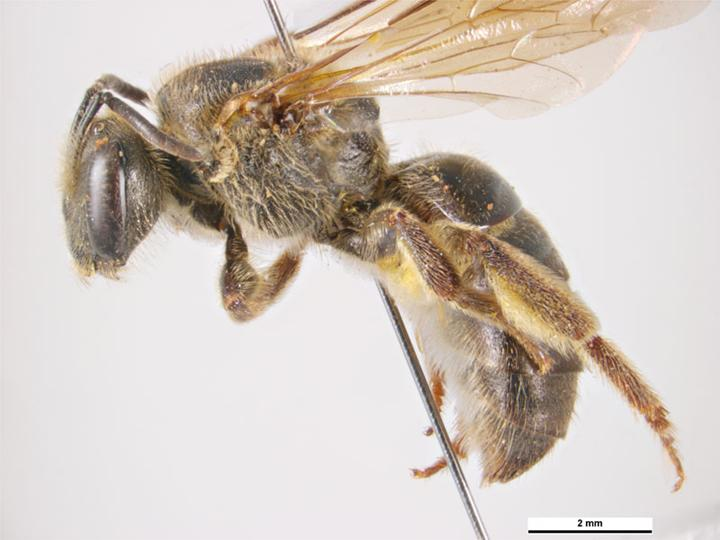
- Female

Scientific classification
- Kingdom: Animalia
- Phylum: Arthropoda
- Clade: Pancrustacea
- Class: Insecta
- Order: Hymenoptera
- Family: Halictidae
- Genus: Lasioglossum
- Species: L. tamburinei

Binomial name
- Lasioglossum tamburinei (Friese, 1917)

Synonyms
- Halictus tamburinei Friese, 1917; Halictus goraeensis Rayment, 1953

= Lasioglossum tamburinei =

Species of bee

Lasioglossum tamburinei, or Lasioglossum (Chilalictus) tamburinei, is a species of bee in the family Halictidae and subfamily Halictinae. It is endemic to Australia. It was described by German entomologist Heinrich Friese in 1917.

== Distribution and habitat ==
The species occurs in eastern Australia. Type localities include Mount Tamborine in south-eastern Queensland and Gorae West in western Victoria.

== Behaviour ==
The adults are flying mellivores. Flowering plants visited by the bees include Arctotheca, Eucalyptus, Jacksonia, Leptospermum, Leucopogon and Melaleuca species.

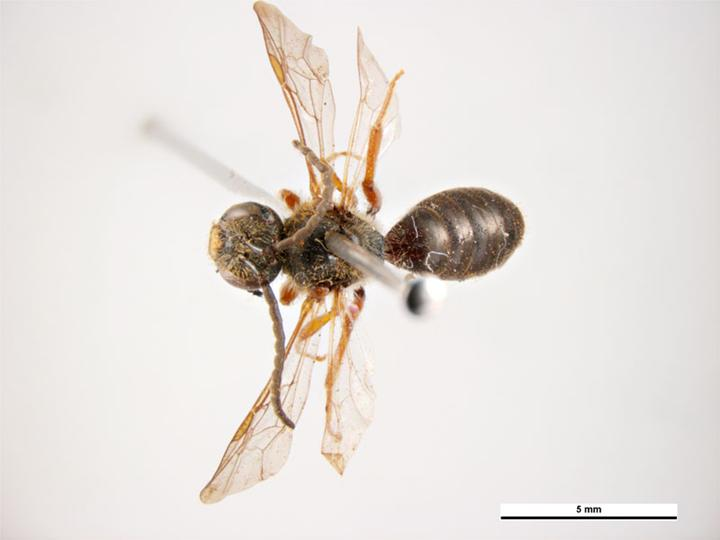
Male
