= B. nobilis =

B. nobilis may refer to:

- Banksia nobilis, the golden dryandra, great dryandra or kerosene bush, a shrub species endemic to Western Australia
- Bismarckia nobilis, a flowering plant species in the palm family endemic to western and northern Madagascar
- Bombus nobilis, a bumblebee species

== See also ==
- Nobilis (disambiguation)
