= M. simonyi =

M. simonyi may refer to:

- Megachile simonyi, a species of bee
- Melittia simonyi, a species of moth
- Microloxia simony, a species of moth
- Mosiona simonyi, a species of moth
