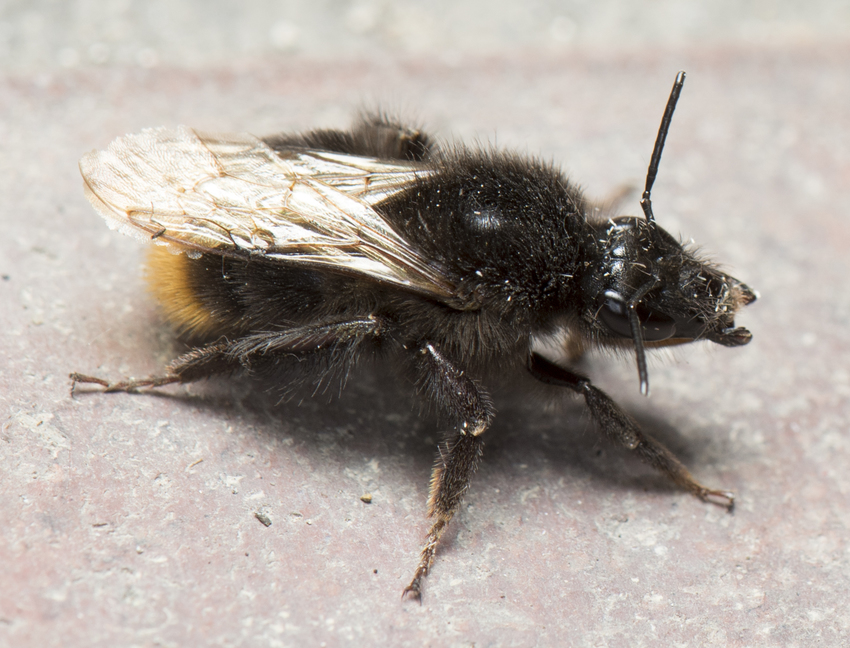

Scientific classification
- Kingdom: Animalia
- Phylum: Arthropoda
- Clade: Pancrustacea
- Class: Insecta
- Order: Hymenoptera
- Family: Apidae
- Genus: Bombus
- Species: B. trifasciatus

Binomial name
- Bombus trifasciatus Smith, 1852

= Bombus trifasciatus =

Species of bee

Bombus trifasciatus is a species of bumblebee commonly known as three-striped bumblebee. It is native to South Asia with additional observations in China, Thailand and Taiwan. Bombus trifasciatus is a co-mimetic species of Bombus breviceps.
