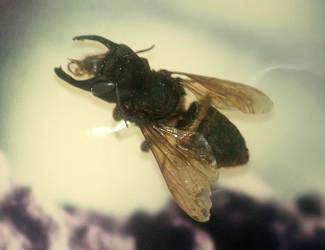

Conservation status
- Vulnerable (IUCN 3.1)

Scientific classification
- Kingdom: Animalia
- Phylum: Arthropoda
- Clade: Pancrustacea
- Class: Insecta
- Order: Hymenoptera
- Family: Megachilidae
- Genus: Megachile
- Subgenus: Callomegachile
- Species: M. pluto

Binomial name
- Megachile pluto Smith, 1860

Synonyms
- Chalicodoma pluto (Smith, 1860)

= Megachile pluto =

Largest known species of bee

Megachile pluto, also known as Wallace's giant bee or raja ofu (lit. 'king of the bees'), is a large resin bee found in Indonesia. With a wingspan of 63.5 mm (2.5 in), it is the largest known living bee species. It was believed to be extinct until several specimens were discovered in 1981. No further sightings were confirmed until two specimens were collected and sold on eBay in 2018. A live female was found and filmed for the first time in 2019.

== Description ==
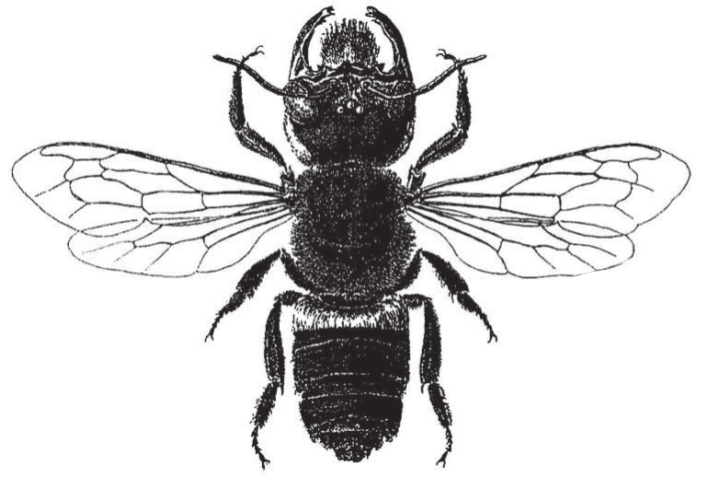
Female

Wallace's giant bee is a black resin bee with well-developed, large jaws. The species exhibits strong sexual dimorphism; females may reach a length of 38 mm (1.5 in), with a wingspan of 63.5 mm (2.5 in), but males only grow to about 23 mm (0.9 in) long. Only females have large jaws. M. pluto is believed to be the largest living bee species, and remains the largest extant bee species described. It is "as long as an adult's thumb". Wallace's giant bee is easily distinguished from other bees due to its large size and jaws, but also a notable white band on the abdomen.

== Distribution and habitat ==
The reports of Wallace's giant bee's existence come only from three islands of the North Moluccas in Indonesia: Bacan, Halmahera, and Tidore. Very little is known about its distribution and habitat requirements, although it is thought to be restricted to primary lowland forests. The islands have become home to oil palm plantations that now occupy much of the former native habitat. This has caused the International Union for Conservation of Nature to label this species as vulnerable.

== Discovery and rediscovery ==
The species was originally collected by Alfred Russel Wallace in 1858, and given the common name "Wallace's giant bee"; it is also known as the "giant mason bee". It was thought to be extinct until it was rediscovered in 1981 by Adam C. Messer, an American entomologist, who found six nests on the island of Bacan and other nearby islands. The bee is among the 25 "most wanted" lost species that are the focus of Global Wildlife Conservation's "Search for Lost Species" initiative.

The bee had not been spotted for over 27 years. In 2018, two specimens were collected by local sellers in Indonesia, one on Bacan in February and the other on Halmahera in September. They were subsequently sold on eBay, highlighting the lack of protection that is afforded to the rare species. In 2019, a single female having established its nest in an arboreal termite colony on the island of Halmahera in Indonesia was found by local naturalist Iswan Maujud as part of a field expedition co-led by Clay Bolt and Eli Wyman. This specimen was filmed and photographed before being released. In August 2025, a New Zealand photographer released the world's first high resolution footage of purely naturalistic observation of a Wallace's Giant Bee, which he filmed unobtrusively in Bacan.

== Ecology ==
Wallace's giant bees build communal nests inside active nests of the tree-dwelling termite Microcerotermes amboinensis, which may serve to hide their existence from attackers. The bee uses tree resin to build compartments inside the termite nest, which protects its galleries. Female bees repeatedly leave their nests to forage for resin, frequently gathered from Anisoptera thurifera. The bee's large jaws assist in resin gathering; the female makes large balls of resin, which are held between the jaws. The association of the bee with the termite may be obligate.

== See also ==
- List of largest insects
