= Bombus grahami =

Scientific classification
- Kingdom: Animalia
- Phylum: Arthropoda
- Clade: Pancrustacea
- Class: Insecta
- Order: Hymenoptera
- Family: Apidae
- Genus: Bombus
- Subgenus: Alpigenobombus
- Species: B. grahami

Binomial name
- Bombus grahami (Frison, 1933)
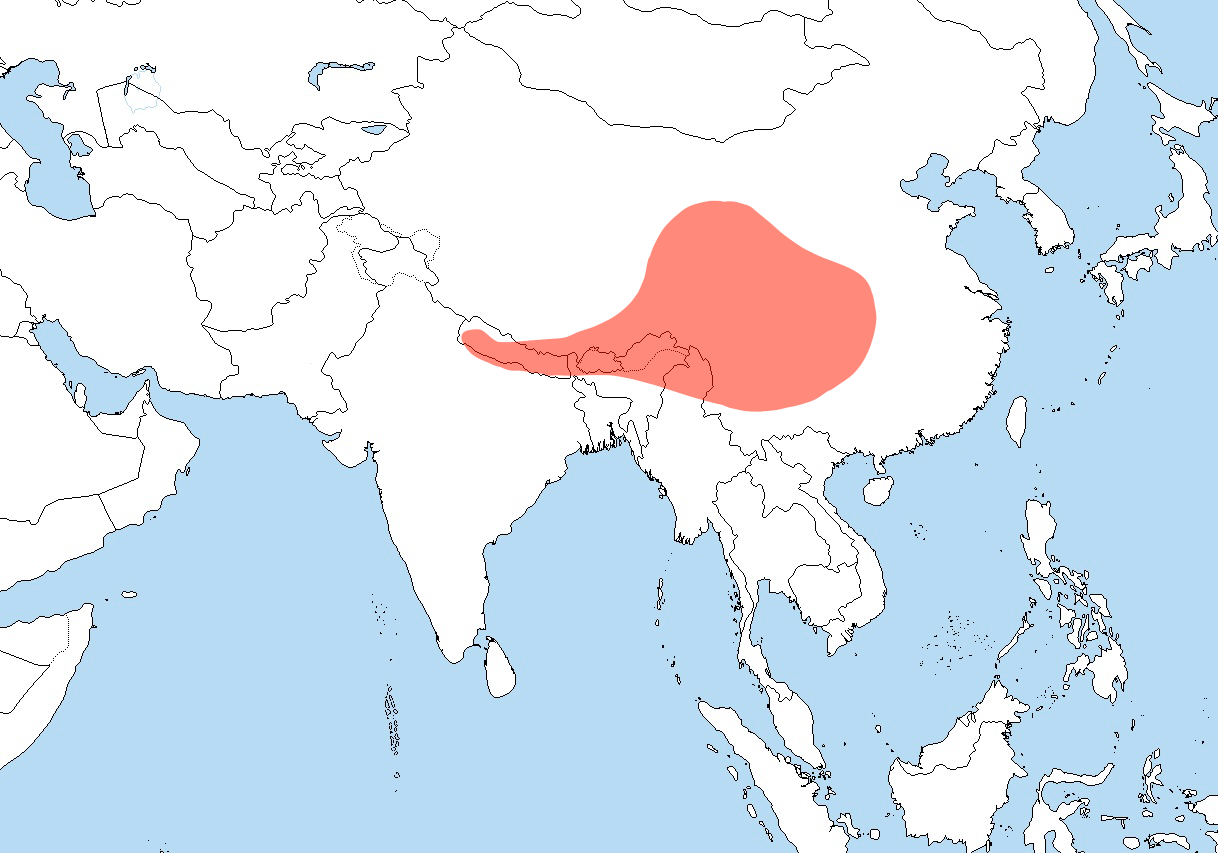

Synonyms
- Alpigenobombus beresovskii Skorikov, 1933 Alpigenobombus grahami melani Wang & Yao, 1993 Bremus grahami var. ordinatus Frison, 1935

Species of bee

Bombus grahami is a species of bumblebee found in Himalaya, a small part of Southeast Asia and China.

== Appearance ==
Females have wings that are very darkly clouded with brown and have dark brown veins. Their body hair is short. The oculo-malar area (the space between the eye and the mandible) is shorter than it is broad. The central area of the clypeus (the face) has only a few large and small, widely-spaced punctures. The hair on the top of the thorax is black, but it often appears silvery olive-grey due to many intermixed grey hairs, with the majority of the hair along the midline being white. In some forms, if the hair is entirely black, then the third abdominal segment is predominantly orange-red.

Males have nearly clear wings, which is unusual among bumblebees as they are much paler than the females' wings. The wing veins are dark brown, and the body hair is short. The male genitalia have a distinct gonostylus that is half as long on its outer side as on its inner side, with a broadly flattened distal lobe. The hair on the top of the thorax is yellow, often with many black hairs intermixed between the wing bases.

This species exhibits different color patterns that allow it to mimic other, more common bumblebees in different regions. In the western and central parts of its range (Himalaya and Hengduan), females with a grey-thorax pattern mimic B. funerarius. In the north-east (hills north of the Sichuan Basin), females with a more extensively black-thorax pattern mimic the abundant B. pyrosoma. Some of these northern females closely resemble B. validus but can be distinguished by their shorter oculo-malar distance. The wings of females with the beresovskii color pattern are also slightly paler. Males of the beresovskii and melani color forms are currently unknown to science.

== Distribution ==
It occurs in China (Central, Tibet and Yunnan), Bhutan , India (Sikkim) and Nepal. However, its range likely extends into northernmost parts of Myanmar.

B. grahami is a bumblebee that lives high in the mountains, from about 2,650 to 3,040 meters above sea level. It is found in the Himalaya and Hengduan mountain ranges.
