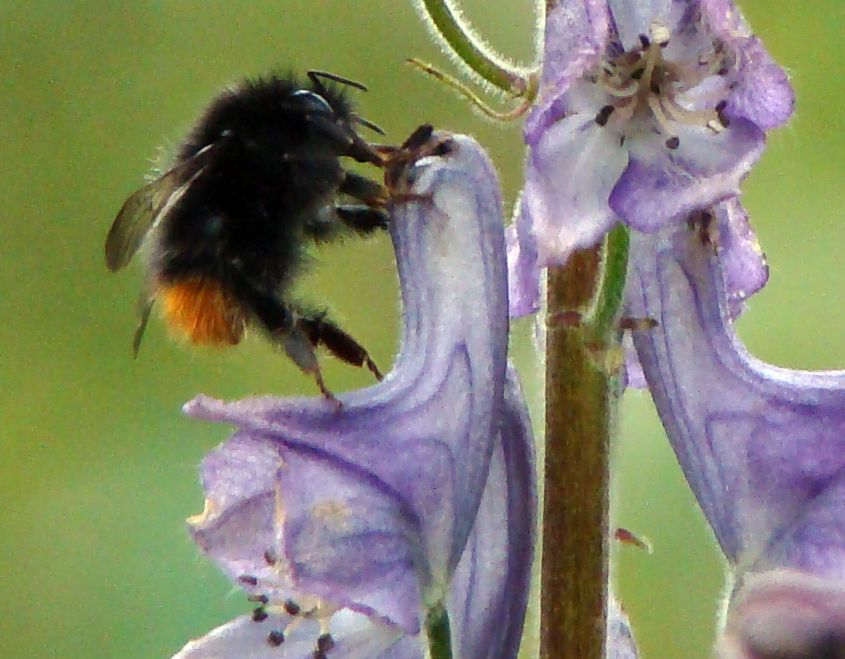

Scientific classification
- Kingdom: Animalia
- Phylum: Arthropoda
- Class: Insecta
- Order: Hymenoptera
- Family: Apidae
- Genus: Bombus
- Subgenus: Alpigenobombus

= Alpigenobombus =

Subgenus of bees

Alpigenobombus is a subgenus of nectar-robbing bumblebees found in Palearctic. This subgenus is easily identified by the unique, six-toothed mandibles of the females, a specialized adaptation for robbing nectar from tubular flowers.

The taxonomy of this subgenus is complex, and the classification of its species has been subject of an ongoing debate.

== Species ==
Genus Alpigenobombus currently consists of 11 species:

- Bombus angustus (Taiwan)
- Bombus breviceps (Himalaya, China, and Southeast Asia)
- Bombus genalis (Himalaya, China, and Southeast Asia)
- Bombus grahami (Himalaya, China and Southeast Asia)
- Bombus rainai (India and Pakistan)
- Bombus kashmirensis (India, Nepal, Pakistan and China)
- Bombus mastrucatus (Europe)
- Bombus nobilis (Himalaya and China)
- Bombus sikkimi (eastern Himalaya and Hengduan regions)
- Bombus validus (China)
- Bombus wurflenii (West Asia)
