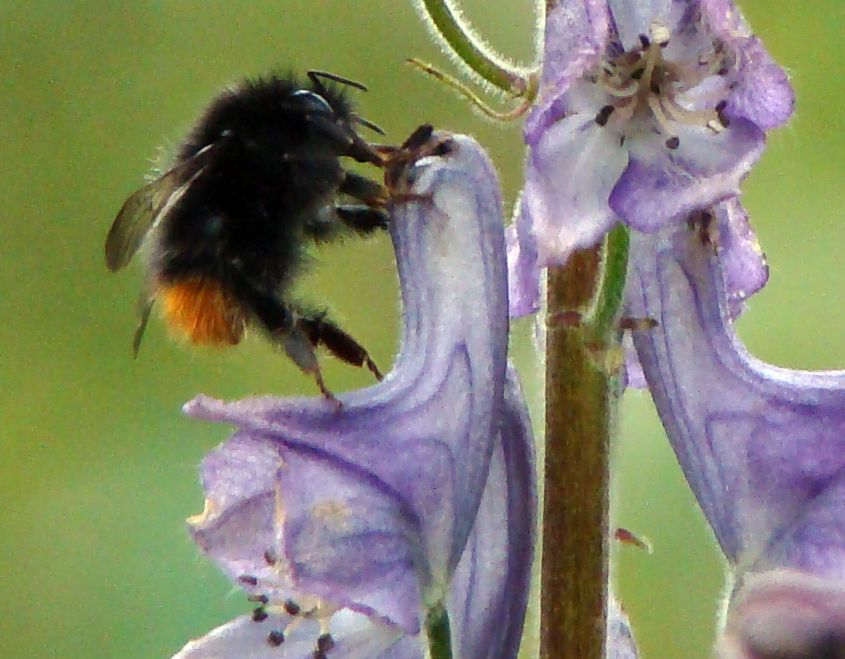

Scientific classification
- Kingdom: Animalia
- Phylum: Arthropoda
- Class: Insecta
- Order: Hymenoptera
- Family: Apidae
- Genus: Bombus
- Subgenus: Alpigenobombus
- Species: B. wurflenii

Binomial name
- Bombus wurflenii Radoszkowski, 1860

Synonyms
- Alpigenobombus wurfleini apfelbecki Reinig, 1988; Alpigenobombus wurfleini knechteli Reinig, 1988; Bombus alpigenus Morawitz, 1873; Bombus brevigena Thomson, 1870; Bombus mastrucatus m. uralicus Pittioni, 1938; Bombus wurfleini Radoszkowski, 1859; Bombus wurfleini var. pyrenaicus Vogt, 1909

= Bombus wurflenii =

Species of bee

Bombus wurflenii , also known as Shaggy Bumblebee, is a species of bumblebee found in West Asia.

== Description ==
This bumblebee has a very short proboscis (tongue), powerful, toothed mandibles, and a short head. The queen has a body length of 19 to 22 mm (0.75 to 0.87 in), a wing span of 36 to 41 mm (1.4 to 1.6 in) and a black, shaggy fur with the three last terga (abdominal segments). The workers, which have body lengths ranging from 13 to 16 mm (0.51 to 0.63 in) and wing spans from 25 to 32 mm (0.98 to 1.26 in), look like the queen, except for the lesser length. The males are 14 to 16 mm (0.55 to 0.63 in) in length, have a wing span from 28 to 32 mm (1.1 to 1.3 in) and are otherwise similar to the females.

Females have wings that are nearly clear with dark brown veins. Their body hair is long. The oculo-malar area (the space between the eye and the mandible) is shorter than it is broad. The clypeus (the front part of the face) is flat and not raised in the center, with a shallow transverse groove that is not interrupted. The central area of the clypeus has many small, uniform punctures and is not shiny. The hair on the top of the thorax is black, with bands of grey-white hair at the front and usually at the rear.

Males also have nearly clear wings with dark brown veins and long body hair. The male genitalia are distinctive; the gonostylus is long and convexly rounded at the tip, with its outer side about a quarter as long as its inner side. The penis-valve head is strongly recurved into a hook that is much longer than broad and is broadly rounded at the end. The hair on the top of the thorax between the wing bases is either predominantly pale cream-yellow or has many pale cream-yellow hairs intermixed.

The species exhibits some color pattern variation from north to south in its range. In Turkey and the Caucasus, females display a white-banded, red-tailed color pattern. This pattern is interpreted as a form of mimicry, allowing them to resemble more abundant bumblebee species in the area, such as B. incertus and B. eriophorus.

== Ecology ==
The species is mainly found in mountainous areas. In Turkey it’s present at altitudes ranging from 1,600 metres (5,200 ft) to 2,600 metres (8,500 ft). The nest is small, containing 80 to 150 individuals.

The bumblebee predominantly forages on flowers such as Vaccinium, Lamiaceae, Scrophulariaceae and Fabaceae. According to Goulson, this species is an opportunistic nectar robber. The bees cut a hole into the back of the flower to access nectar, and so they do not participate in pollination.

== Distribution ==
B. wurflenii is found in West Asia, including Turkey, Georgia, Armenia, Azerbaijan, and Iran. Its range also extends into Russia, specifically the Caucasus and the Ural Mountains.
