= Megachile timorensis =

Scientific classification
- Kingdom: Animalia
- Phylum: Arthropoda
- Clade: Pancrustacea
- Class: Insecta
- Order: Hymenoptera
- Family: Megachilidae
- Genus: Megachile
- Species: M. timorensis

Binomial name
- Megachile timorensis Friese, 1918

Species of leafcutter bee (Megachile)

Megachile timorensis is a species of bee in the family Megachilidae. It was described by Heinrich Friese in 1918.
