= Bombus nobilis =

Scientific classification
- Kingdom: Animalia
- Phylum: Arthropoda
- Clade: Pancrustacea
- Class: Insecta
- Order: Hymenoptera
- Family: Apidae
- Genus: Bombus
- Subgenus: Alpigenobombus
- Species: B. nobilis

Binomial name
- Bombus nobilis Friese, 1905
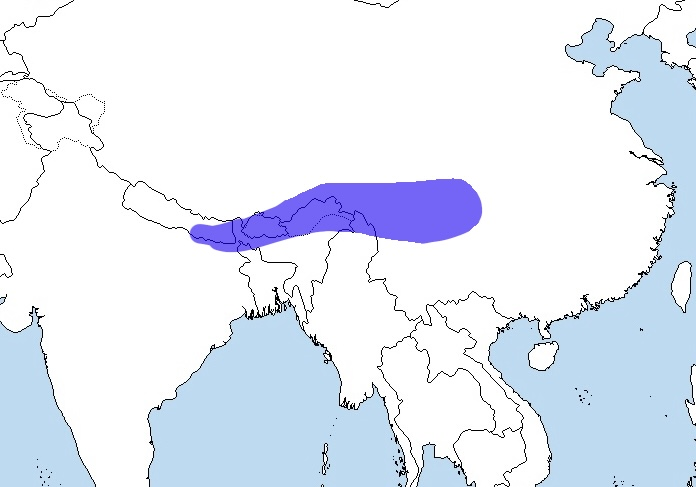

Synonyms
- Bombus xizangensis Wang 1979 Bombus chayaensis Wang 1979

Species of bumblebee

Bombus nobilis is a species of bumblebee found in South Asia and China.

== Appearance ==
This species has wings that are lightly tinted brown with dark brown veins. Its body hair is of medium length.

For females, the hair on the front of the thorax and the scutellum can be either golden yellow or grey-white. The first abdominal segment is yellow. The second segment can be mostly black or have large yellow patches on its sides.

For males, the hair on the front of the thorax and scutellum is also either golden yellow or grey-white. The first abdominal segment is yellow or nearly white. The male's reproductive parts have a distinct, short, and rounded shape.

== Distribution ==
This species is present in Bhutan, China (Yunnan), India (Arunachal Pradesh, Sikkim) and Nepal.
