= Megachile badia =

Scientific classification
- Kingdom: Animalia
- Phylum: Arthropoda
- Clade: Pancrustacea
- Class: Insecta
- Order: Hymenoptera
- Family: Megachilidae
- Genus: Megachile
- Species: M. badia

Binomial name
- Megachile badia Bingham, 1890

Species of leafcutter bee (Megachile)

Megachile badia is a species of bee in the family Megachilidae. It was described by Charles Thomas Bingham in 1890.
