= Megachile malayana =

Scientific classification
- Kingdom: Animalia
- Phylum: Arthropoda
- Clade: Pancrustacea
- Class: Insecta
- Order: Hymenoptera
- Family: Megachilidae
- Genus: Megachile
- Species: M. malayana

Binomial name
- Megachile malayana Cameron, 1901

Species of leafcutter bee (Megachile)

Megachile malayana is a species of bee in the family Megachilidae. It was described by Cameron in 1901.
