= Megachile chrysorrhoea =

Scientific classification
- Kingdom: Animalia
- Phylum: Arthropoda
- Clade: Pancrustacea
- Class: Insecta
- Order: Hymenoptera
- Family: Megachilidae
- Genus: Megachile
- Species: M. chrysorrhoea

Binomial name
- Megachile chrysorrhoea Gerstäcker, 1857

Species of leafcutter bee (Megachile)

Megachile chrysorrhoea is a species of bee in the family Megachilidae.
