= Megachile montibia =

Scientific classification
- Kingdom: Animalia
- Phylum: Arthropoda
- Clade: Pancrustacea
- Class: Insecta
- Order: Hymenoptera
- Family: Megachilidae
- Genus: Megachile
- Species: M. montibia

Binomial name
- Megachile montibia Strand, 1911

Species of leafcutter bee (Megachile)

Megachile montibia is a species of bee in the family Megachilidae. It was described by Strand in 1911.
