= Megachile rambutwan =

Scientific classification
- Kingdom: Animalia
- Phylum: Arthropoda
- Clade: Pancrustacea
- Class: Insecta
- Order: Hymenoptera
- Family: Megachilidae
- Genus: Megachile
- Species: M. rambutwan

Binomial name
- Megachile rambutwan Cheesman, 1936

Species of leafcutter bee (Megachile)

Megachile rambutwan is a species of bee in the family Megachilidae. It was described by Cheesman in 1936.
