= Megachile cephalotes =

Scientific classification
- Kingdom: Animalia
- Phylum: Arthropoda
- Clade: Pancrustacea
- Class: Insecta
- Order: Hymenoptera
- Family: Megachilidae
- Genus: Megachile
- Species: M. cephalotes

Binomial name
- Megachile cephalotes Smith, 1853

Species of leafcutter bee (Megachile)

Megachile cephalotes is a species of bee in the family Megachilidae. It was described by Smith in 1853.

M. cephalotes tend to make nests out of resin and are commonly referred to as resin bees. They exhibit floral constancy and frequently pollinate Grewia Asiatic plants. Female species deposit more pollen due to their larger abdomens. Males travel longer distances for pollination, as females construct nests, lay eggs, and care for young.
