= Megachile szentivanyi =

Scientific classification
- Kingdom: Animalia
- Phylum: Arthropoda
- Clade: Pancrustacea
- Class: Insecta
- Order: Hymenoptera
- Family: Megachilidae
- Genus: Megachile
- Species: M. szentivanyi

Binomial name
- Megachile szentivanyi (Michener, 1965)

Species of leafcutter bee (Megachile)

Megachile szentivanyi is a species of bee in the family Megachilidae. It was described by Charles Duncan Michener in 1965.
