= Megachile monticola =

Scientific classification
- Kingdom: Animalia
- Phylum: Arthropoda
- Clade: Pancrustacea
- Class: Insecta
- Order: Hymenoptera
- Family: Megachilidae
- Genus: Megachile
- Species: M. monticola

Binomial name
- Megachile monticola Smith, 1853

Species of leafcutter bee (Megachile)

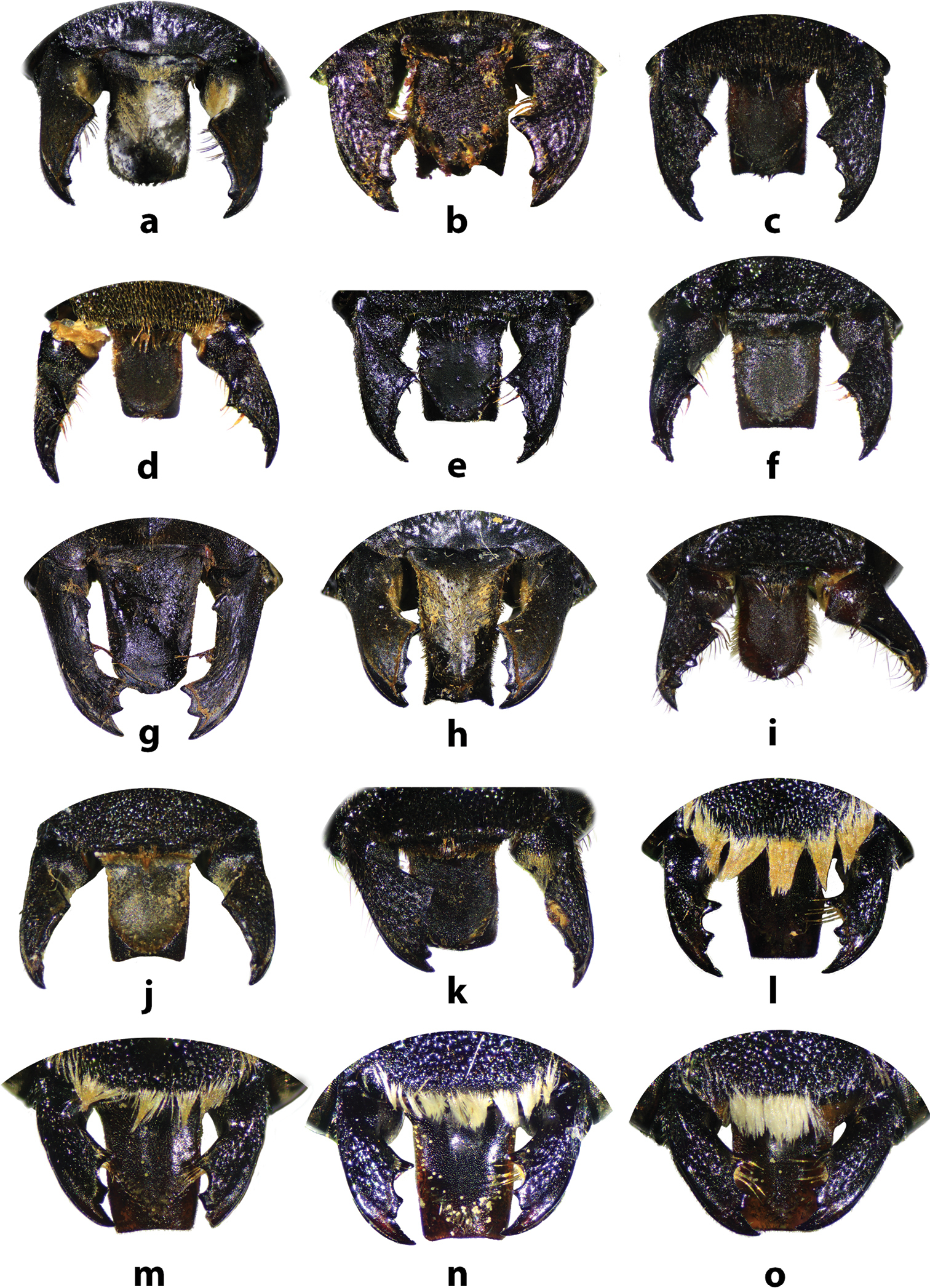
Mandibles of the Thai Callomegachile.

Megachile monticola is a species of bee in the family Megachilidae. It was described by Smith in 1853.
