= Megachile lateritia =

Scientific classification
- Kingdom: Animalia
- Phylum: Arthropoda
- Clade: Pancrustacea
- Class: Insecta
- Order: Hymenoptera
- Family: Megachilidae
- Genus: Megachile
- Species: M. lateritia

Binomial name
- Megachile lateritia Smith, 1858

Species of leafcutter bee (Megachile)

Megachile lateritia is a species of bee in the family Megachilidae. It was described by Smith in 1858.
