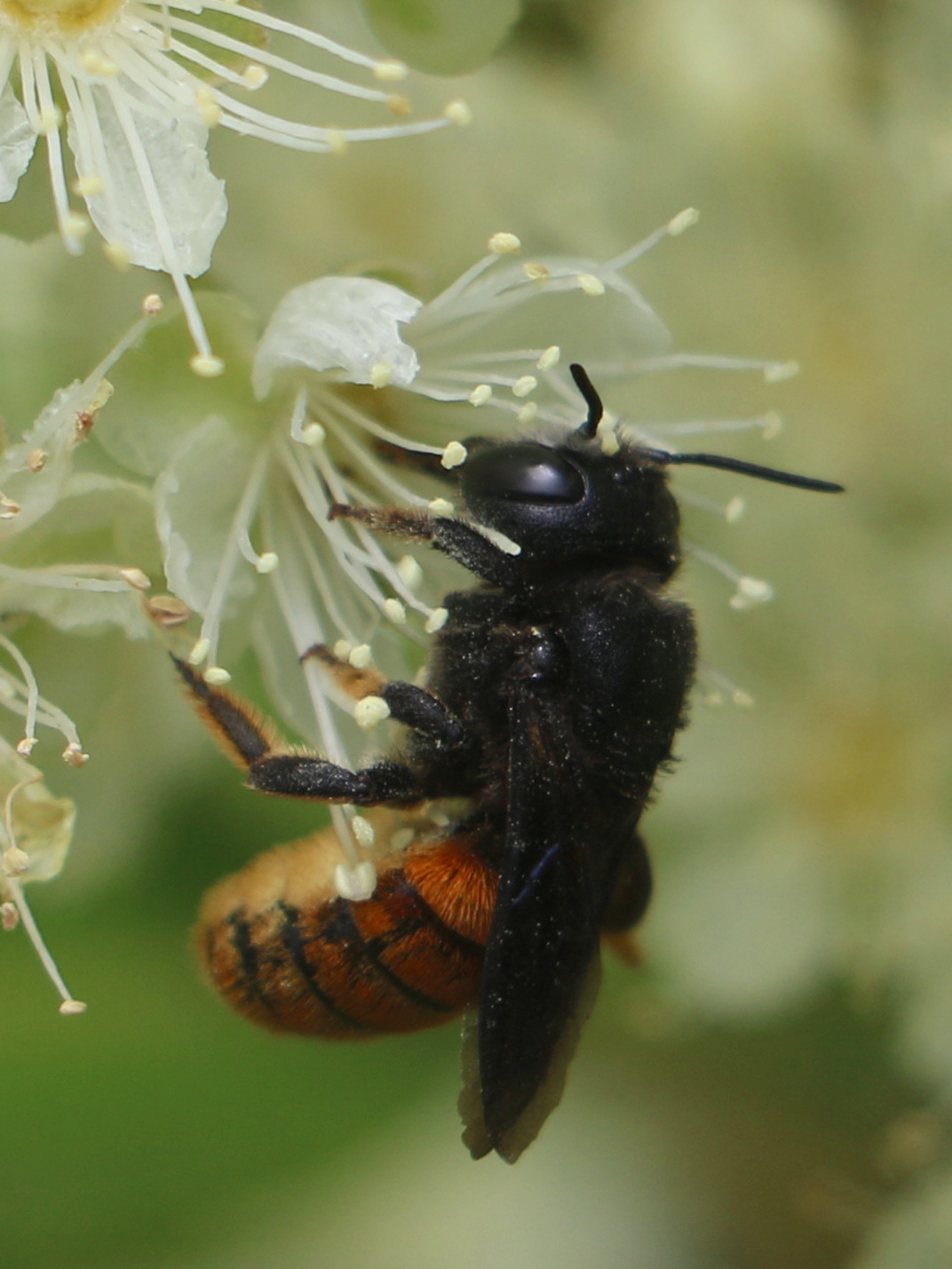

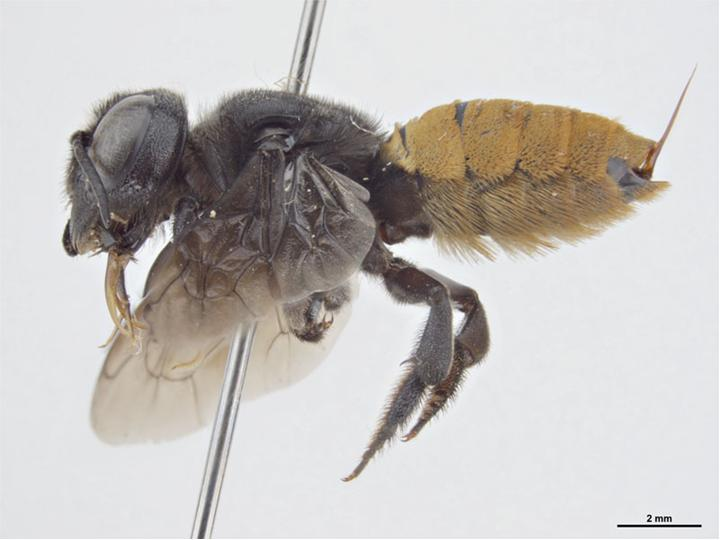
- Female

Scientific classification
- Kingdom: Animalia
- Phylum: Arthropoda
- Clade: Pancrustacea
- Class: Insecta
- Order: Hymenoptera
- Family: Megachilidae
- Genus: Megachile
- Species: M. mystaceana

Binomial name
- Megachile mystaceana (Michener, 1962)

= Megachile mystaceana =

Species of leafcutter bee (Megachile)

Megachile mystaceana, the fire-tailed resin bee, is a species of bee in the family Megachilidae. It was described by Charles Duncan Michener in 1962.
