= Megachile nidulator =

Scientific classification
- Kingdom: Animalia
- Phylum: Arthropoda
- Clade: Pancrustacea
- Class: Insecta
- Order: Hymenoptera
- Family: Megachilidae
- Genus: Megachile
- Species: M. nidulator

Binomial name
- Megachile nidulator Smith, 1864

Species of leafcutter bee (Megachile)

Megachile nidulator is a species of bee in the family Megachilidae. It was described by Smith in 1864.
