= Megachile ardens =

Scientific classification
- Kingdom: Animalia
- Phylum: Arthropoda
- Clade: Pancrustacea
- Class: Insecta
- Order: Hymenoptera
- Family: Megachilidae
- Genus: Megachile
- Species: M. ardens

Binomial name
- Megachile ardens Smith, 1897

Species of leafcutter bee (Megachile)

Megachile ardens is a species of bee in the family Megachilidae. It was described by Smith in 1897.
