= Megachile funeraria =

Scientific classification
- Kingdom: Animalia
- Phylum: Arthropoda
- Clade: Pancrustacea
- Class: Insecta
- Order: Hymenoptera
- Family: Megachilidae
- Genus: Megachile
- Species: M. funeraria

Binomial name
- Megachile funeraria Smith, 1863

Species of leafcutter bee (Megachile)

Megachile funeraria is a species of bee in the family Megachilidae. It was described by Smith in 1863.
