= Megachile biseta =

Scientific classification
- Kingdom: Animalia
- Phylum: Arthropoda
- Clade: Pancrustacea
- Class: Insecta
- Order: Hymenoptera
- Family: Megachilidae
- Genus: Megachile
- Species: M. biseta

Binomial name
- Megachile biseta Vachal, 1903

Species of leafcutter bee (Megachile)

Megachile biseta is a species of bee in the family Megachilidae. It was described by Vachal in 1903.
