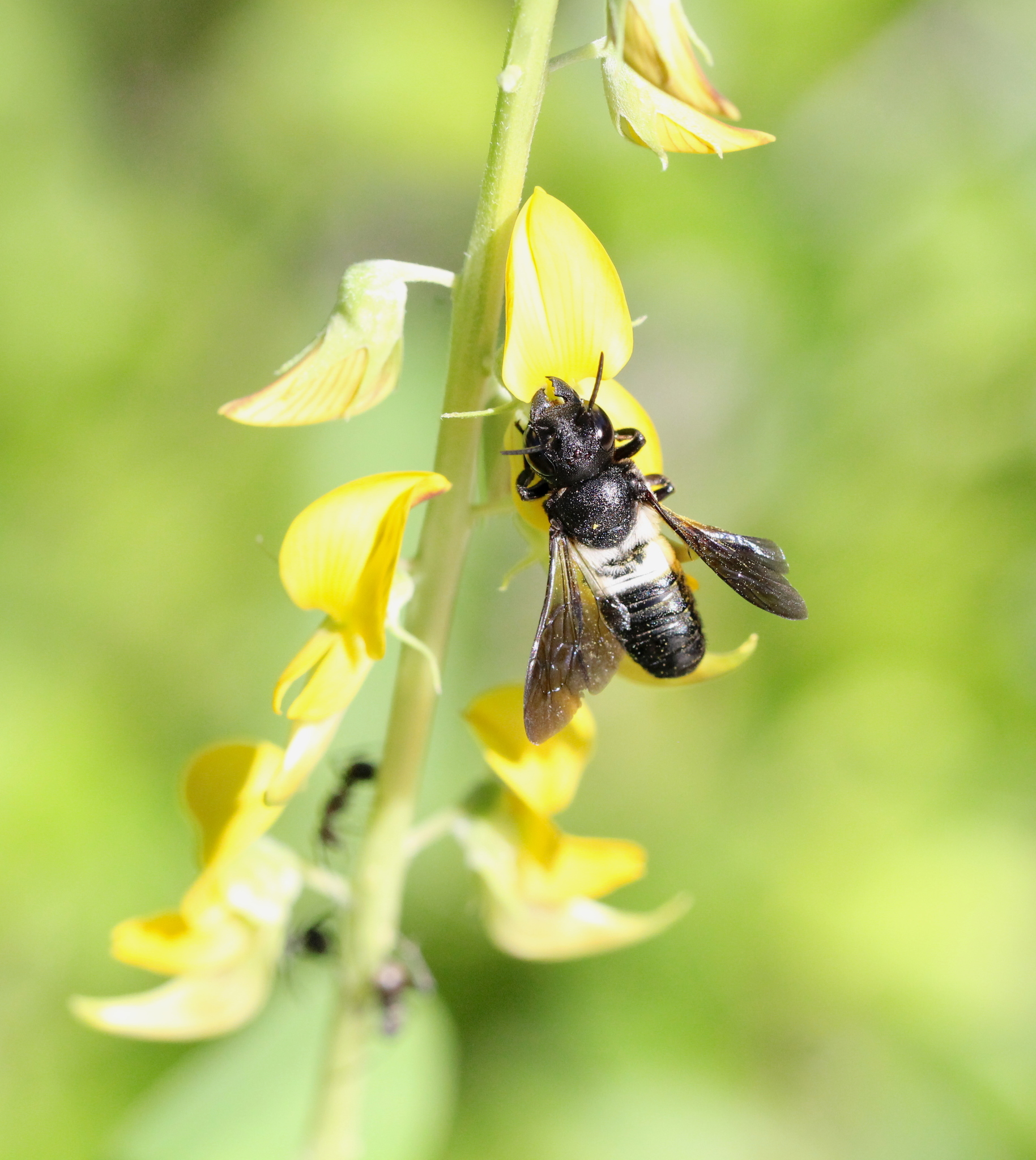

Scientific classification
- Kingdom: Animalia
- Phylum: Arthropoda
- Clade: Pancrustacea
- Class: Insecta
- Order: Hymenoptera
- Family: Megachilidae
- Genus: Megachile
- Species: M. disjunctiformis

Binomial name
- Megachile disjunctiformis Cockerell, 1911

= Megachile disjunctiformis =

Species of leafcutter bee (Megachile)

Megachile disjunctiformis is a species of bee in the family Megachilidae. It was described by Theodore Dru Alison Cockerell in 1911.
