= Megachile antinorii =

Scientific classification
- Kingdom: Animalia
- Phylum: Arthropoda
- Clade: Pancrustacea
- Class: Insecta
- Order: Hymenoptera
- Family: Megachilidae
- Genus: Megachile
- Species: M. antinorii

Binomial name
- Megachile antinorii Gribodo, 1879

Species of leafcutter bee (Megachile)

Megachile antinorii is a species of bee in the family Megachilidae. It was described by Gribodo in 1879.
