= Megachile osea =

Scientific classification
- Kingdom: Animalia
- Phylum: Arthropoda
- Clade: Pancrustacea
- Class: Insecta
- Order: Hymenoptera
- Family: Megachilidae
- Genus: Megachile
- Species: M. osea

Binomial name
- Megachile osea Cameron, 1902

Species of leafcutter bee (Megachile)

Megachile osea is a species of bee in the family Megachilidae. It was described by Cameron in 1902.
