= Megachile davaonensis =

Scientific classification
- Kingdom: Animalia
- Phylum: Arthropoda
- Clade: Pancrustacea
- Class: Insecta
- Order: Hymenoptera
- Family: Megachilidae
- Genus: Megachile
- Species: M. davaonensis

Binomial name
- Megachile davaonensis Cockerell, 1918

Species of leafcutter bee (Megachile)

Megachile davaonensis is a species of bee in the family Megachilidae. It was described by Theodore Dru Alison Cockerell in 1918.
