= Megachile rufipes =

Scientific classification
- Kingdom: Animalia
- Phylum: Arthropoda
- Clade: Pancrustacea
- Class: Insecta
- Order: Hymenoptera
- Family: Megachilidae
- Genus: Megachile
- Species: M. rufipes

Binomial name
- Megachile rufipes (Fabricius, 1781)

Species of leafcutter bee (Megachile)

Megachile rufipes is a species of bee in the family Megachilidae. It was described by Johan Christian Fabricius in 1781.
