= Megachile relata =

Scientific classification
- Kingdom: Animalia
- Phylum: Arthropoda
- Clade: Pancrustacea
- Class: Insecta
- Order: Hymenoptera
- Family: Megachilidae
- Genus: Megachile
- Species: M. relata

Binomial name
- Megachile relata Smith, 1879

Species of leafcutter bee (Megachile)

Megachile relata is a species of leafcutter bee in the family Megachilidae. It is native to southern Asia and was described by Frederick Smith in 1879.
