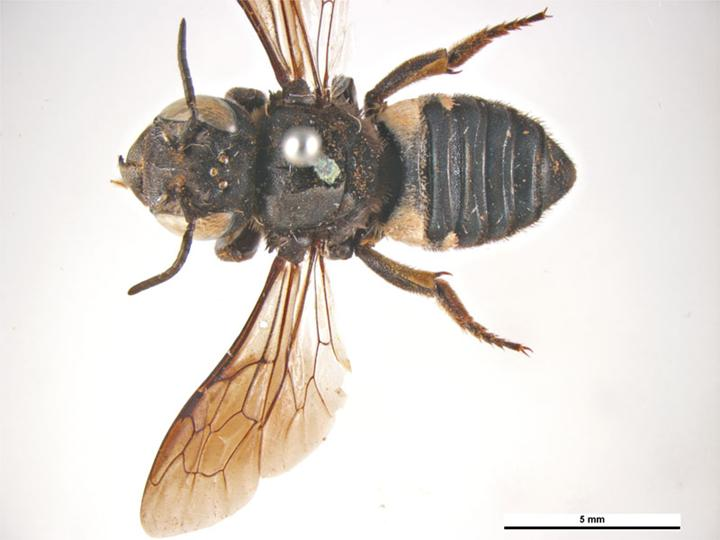

Scientific classification
- Kingdom: Animalia
- Phylum: Arthropoda
- Clade: Pancrustacea
- Class: Insecta
- Order: Hymenoptera
- Family: Megachilidae
- Genus: Megachile
- Species: M. cincturata

Binomial name
- Megachile cincturata Cockerell, 1912

= Megachile cincturata =

Species of leafcutter bee (Megachile)

Megachile cincturata is a species of bee in the family Megachilidae. It was described by Theodore Dru Alison Cockerell in 1912.
