= Megachile fulvipennis =

Scientific classification
- Kingdom: Animalia
- Phylum: Arthropoda
- Clade: Pancrustacea
- Class: Insecta
- Order: Hymenoptera
- Family: Megachilidae
- Genus: Megachile
- Species: M. fulvipennis

Binomial name
- Megachile fulvipennis Smith, 1879

Species of leafcutter bee (Megachile)

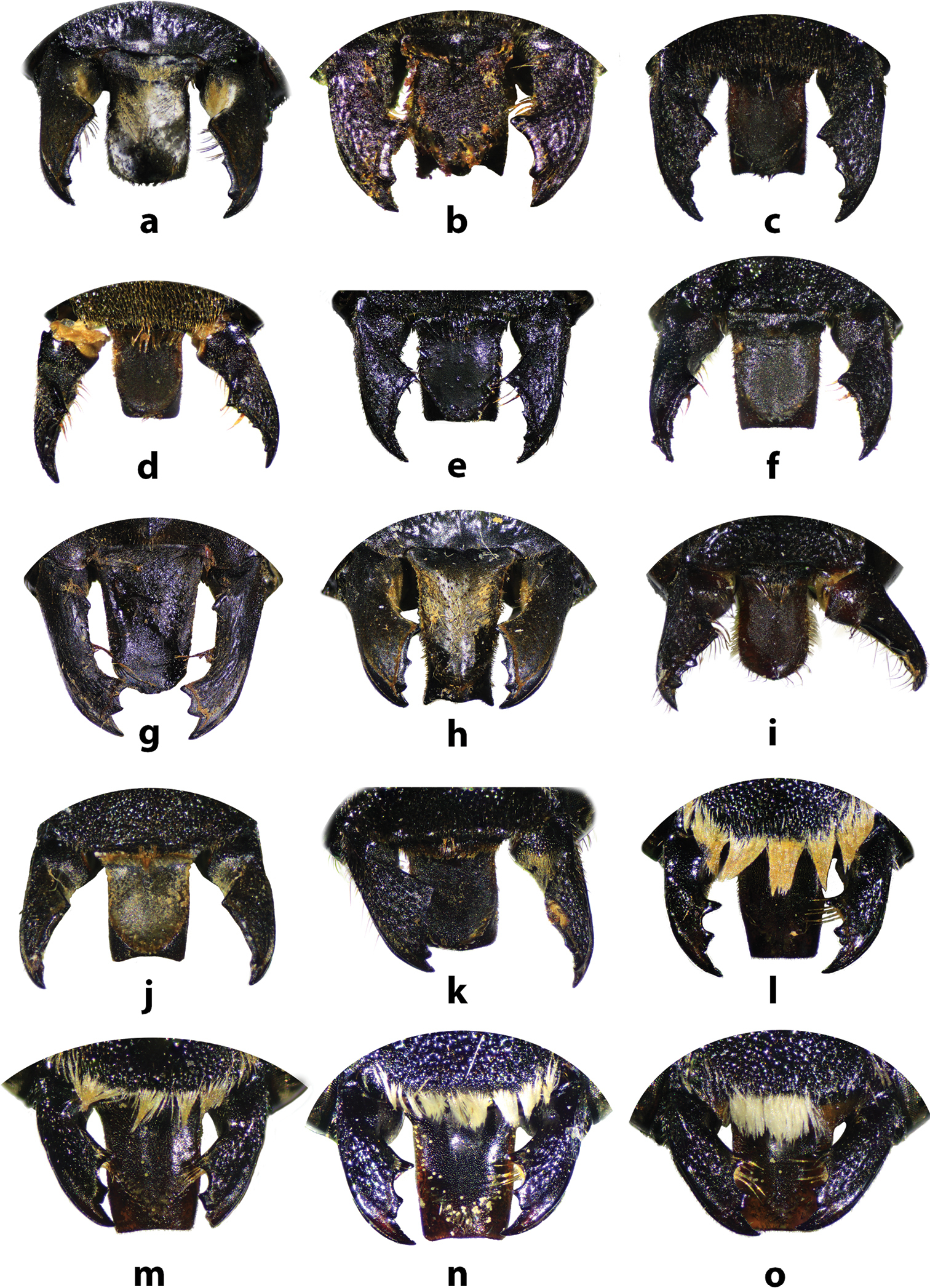
Mandibles of different species of Megachile bees.

Megachile fulvipennis is a species of bee in the family Megachilidae. It was described by Smith in 1879.
