= Megachile mefistofelica =

Scientific classification
- Kingdom: Animalia
- Phylum: Arthropoda
- Clade: Pancrustacea
- Class: Insecta
- Order: Hymenoptera
- Family: Megachilidae
- Genus: Megachile
- Species: M. mefistofelica

Binomial name
- Megachile mefistofelica Gribodo, 1894

Species of leafcutter bee (Megachile)

Megachile mefistofelica is a species of bee in the family Megachilidae. It was described by Gribodo in 1894.
