= Megachile rufipennis =

Scientific classification
- Kingdom: Animalia
- Phylum: Arthropoda
- Clade: Pancrustacea
- Class: Insecta
- Order: Hymenoptera
- Family: Megachilidae
- Genus: Megachile
- Species: M. rufipennis

Binomial name
- Megachile rufipennis (Fabricius, 1793)

Species of leafcutter bee (Megachile)

Megachile rufipennis is a species of bee in the family Megachilidae. It was described by Johan Christian Fabricius in 1793.
