= Megachile simonyi =

Scientific classification
- Kingdom: Animalia
- Phylum: Arthropoda
- Clade: Pancrustacea
- Class: Insecta
- Order: Hymenoptera
- Family: Megachilidae
- Genus: Megachile
- Species: M. simonyi

Binomial name
- Megachile simonyi Friese, 1903

Species of leafcutter bee (Megachile)

Megachile simonyi is a species of bee in the family Megachilidae. It was described by Heinrich Friese in 1903.

It is found in Yemen and Eritrea. The specific name is named after Oskar Simony, who discovered one of the syntypes in Ra's Fartak, Yemen.

The male is 13–14 mm (0.51–0.55 in) long and 4–4.5 mm (0.16–0.18 in) wide; the female is 11 mm (0.43 in) long and 4 mm (0.16 in) wide.
