= Megachile gigas =

Scientific classification
- Kingdom: Animalia
- Phylum: Arthropoda
- Clade: Pancrustacea
- Class: Insecta
- Order: Hymenoptera
- Family: Megachilidae
- Genus: Megachile
- Species: M. gigas

Binomial name
- Megachile gigas Schrottky, 1908

Species of leafcutter bee (Megachile)

Megachile gigas is a species of bee in the family Megachilidae. It was described by Schrottky in 1908.
