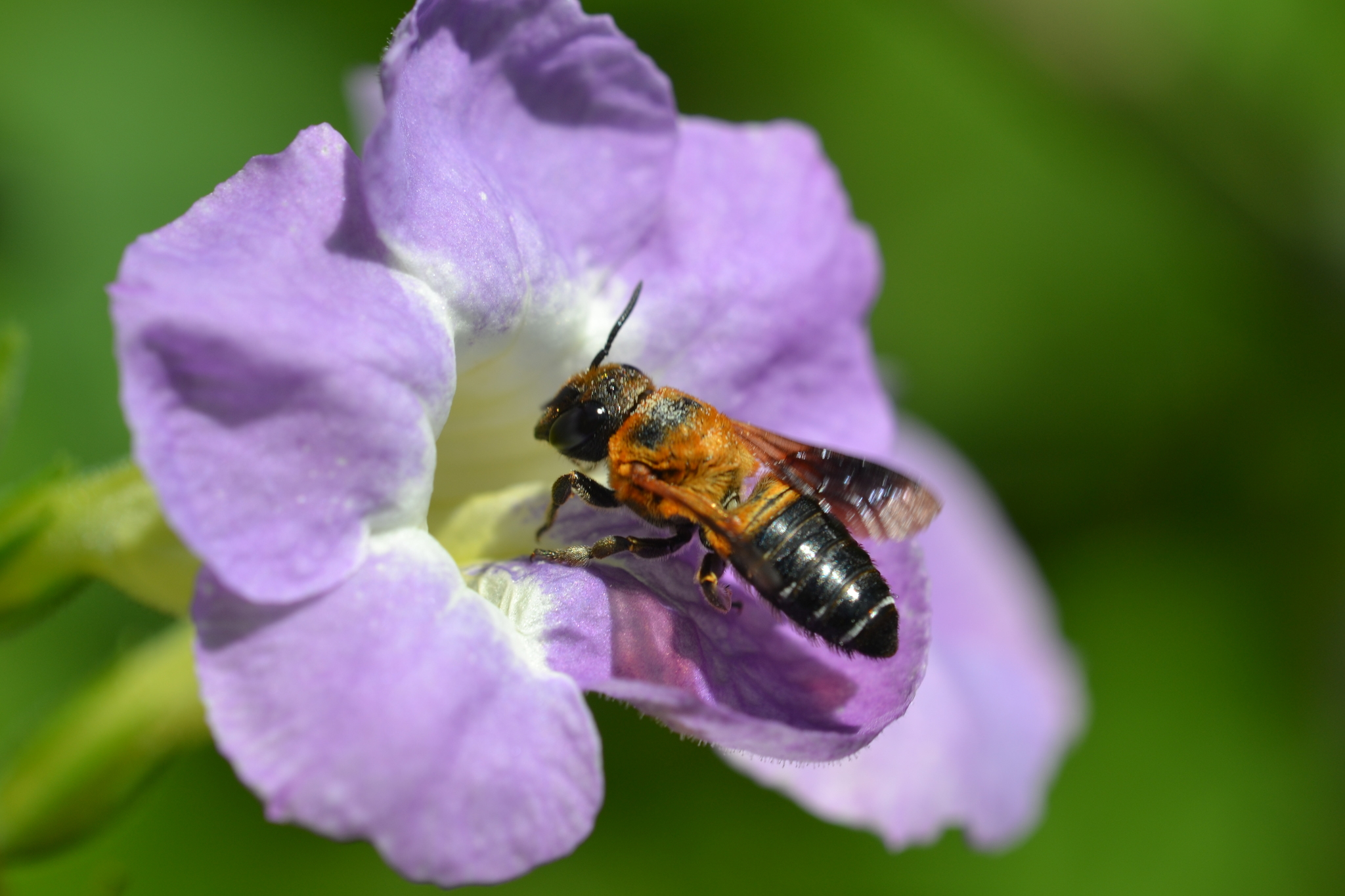

Scientific classification
- Kingdom: Animalia
- Phylum: Arthropoda
- Clade: Pancrustacea
- Class: Insecta
- Order: Hymenoptera
- Family: Megachilidae
- Genus: Megachile
- Species: M. umbripennis

Binomial name
- Megachile umbripennis Smith, 1853

= Megachile umbripennis =

Species of leafcutter bee (Megachile)

Megachile umbripennis is a species of bee in the family Megachilidae. It was described by Frederick Smith in 1853. Megachile umbripennis is named for its characteristic dark wings. The species is found in southern Asia, various Pacific islands, and the eastern coast of the United States.
