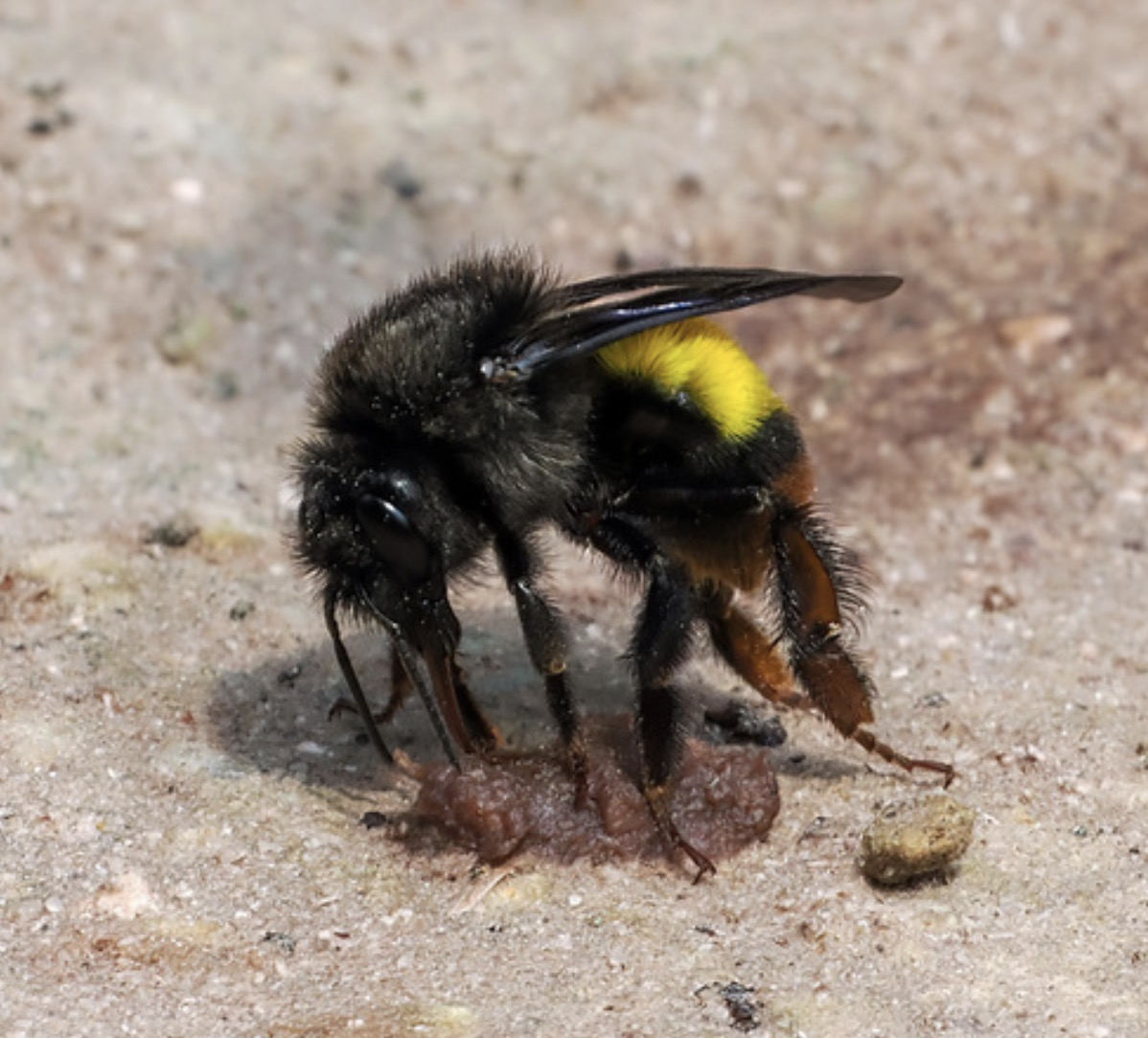

Scientific classification
- Kingdom: Animalia
- Phylum: Arthropoda
- Clade: Pancrustacea
- Class: Insecta
- Order: Hymenoptera
- Family: Apidae
- Genus: Bombus
- Subgenus: Alpigenobombus
- Species: B. breviceps

Binomial name
- Bombus breviceps Smith, 1852
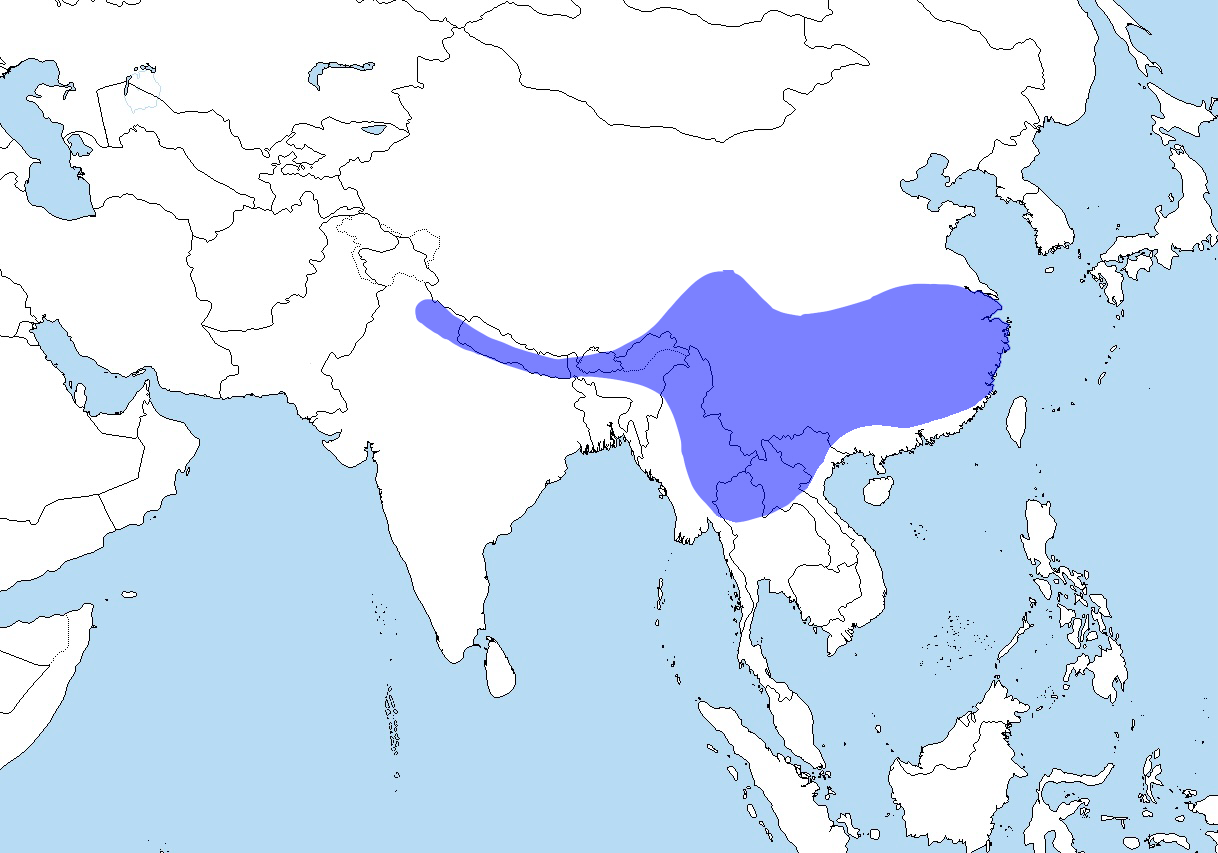

= Bombus breviceps =

Species of bee

Bombus breviceps, also known as Short-faced Bumblebee, is a species of bumblebee found in Himalaya, Southeast Asia and China. This species often lives alongside other bumblebees and is frequently one of the most numerous species in the area.

== Appearance ==
This species has very dark, brownish wings with dark brown veins and short hair.

Females have black hair on their back, often with orange bands at the front and rear. The first tail segment is yellow.

B. breviceps color pattern changes across its range to mimic different, more common bees. In the western and central parts of its range, like the Himalaya, it has a black thorax. In the southeastern parts, like Southeast Asia, it has an orange-banded thorax. These variations allow it to resemble other abundant bumblebee species local to each area. Some populations also have a black tail.

== Distribution ==
This species is present in Bhutan, China, northernmost parts of India, Laos, eastern Myanmar, Nepal, Thailand and northwestern Vietnam.

== Pollination ==
B. breviceps is polylectic, meaning it collects pollen from many different types of plants. It has been recorded visiting 47 plant species, most common are Crotalaria assamica and the common bramble, Rubus alceaefolius.

This species is a main pollinator of black cardamom (Amomum subulatum) crops in India. Queen B. breviceps bees begin to form new colonies in late March, whereas worker bees forage from early May until mid-December. The B. breviceps are able to use their small body size to fit in the flower and extract pollen that they then carry in their thorax and distribute to different plants and crops to contribute to cross-pollination.

== Reproduction ==
In its nests, a queen bee will lay her first eggs about two weeks after she is ready to start a colony. The development from egg to adult bee takes about 27 days. The egg stage lasts about 4 days, the larval stage about 12 days, and the pupal stage about 11 days. A single colony can become very large, producing between 60 and 660 worker bees and 100 to 920 male bees.
