= Megachile aterrima =

Scientific classification
- Kingdom: Animalia
- Phylum: Arthropoda
- Clade: Pancrustacea
- Class: Insecta
- Order: Hymenoptera
- Family: Megachilidae
- Genus: Megachile
- Species: M. aterrima

Binomial name
- Megachile aterrima Smith, 1861

Species of leafcutter bee (Megachile)

Megachile aterrima is a species of bee in the family Megachilidae. It was described by Smith in 1861.
