= Heinrich Friese =

German biologist and entomologist

- Born: 4 May 1860; Schwerin
- Died: 8 September 1948 (aged 88); Schwerin
- Known for: Melittology
- Scientific career
- Fields: Entomology and biology
- Doctoral students: Adolpho Ducke
- Author abbrev. (zoology): H. Friese

Heinrich Friedrich August Karl Ludwig Friese (4 May 1860, Schwerin – 8 September 1948, Schwerin) was a German biologist and entomologist, a specialist of bees (melittologist). Between 1883 and 1939, he described 1,989 new species and 564 new varieties or subspecies of insects, 99% of which were bees.

== Major works ==
He has published 270 scientific articles, including a 6-volume report on European bees (1895-1901).

- Die Apidae (Blumenwespen) von Argentina nach den Reisenergebnissen der Herren A. C. Jensen-Haarup und P. Jörgensen in den Jahren 1904—1907, 1908
- Die Bienen Europas (Apidae europaeae). Akademische Druck- und Verlagsanstalt, Graz 1969 (Nachdruck der Erstausgabe 1895—1901)
- Megachilinae, Hymenoptera; Apidae. Friedländer, Berlin 1911
- Die europäischen Bienen (Apidae) — Das Leben und Wirken unserer Blumenwespen. Eine Darstellung der Lebensweise unserer wilden wie gesellig lebenden Bienen nach eigenen Untersuchungen für Naturfreunde, Lehrer u. Zoologen. Vereinigung Wissenschaftlicher Verleger, Berlin, Leipzig 1922

== Tributes ==
The bee genus Eufriesea is named after him, along with stingless bee (Meliponini) genus Frieseomelitta, as well as a number of separate species such as Megachile friesei and Sphecodes friesei.
