= Bell Bowl Prairie =

Prairie in Rockford, Illinois, USA

- Prairie
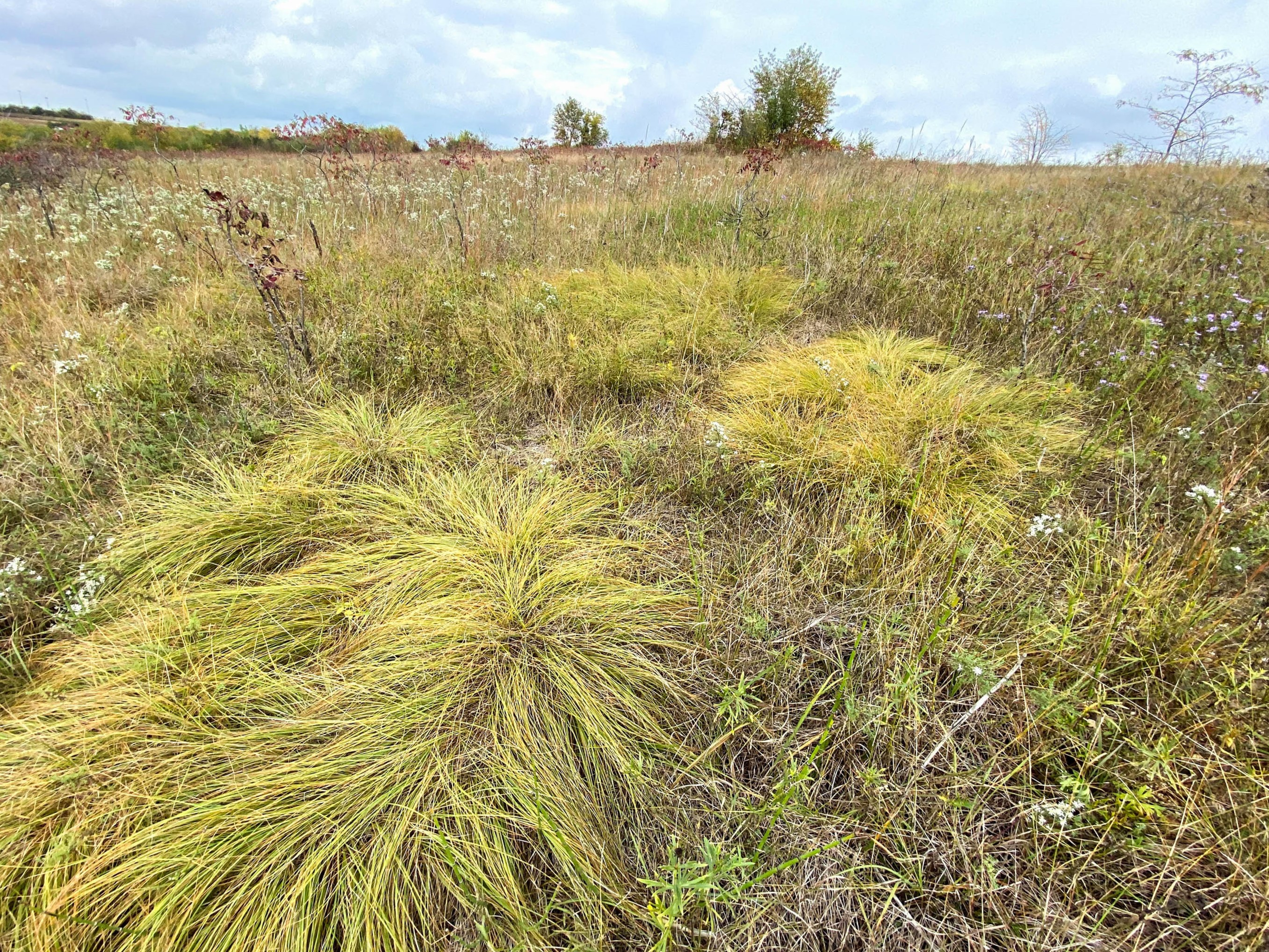
- Prairie dropseed (Sporobolus heterolepis) at Bell Bowl Prairie

- Location within Illinois
- Coordinates: 42.19°N 89.10°W
- Location: Rockford, Illinois

Bell Bowl Prairie is a remnant dry gravel prairie located on public land in Rockford, Illinois (Winnebago County). It is considered a Category I Illinois Natural Areas Inventory (INAI) site due to its high quality natural community of native flora and fauna. It is currently owned by the Greater Rockford Airport Authority (GRAA), a public taxing agency in Winnebago County. According to GRAA, the prairie is "one of the best-preserved prairies in northern Illinois – a glimpse of the Rockford area prior to colonization".

Assessed in 2018, 5 acres of the approximately 22-acre prairie were considered high quality (roughly corresponding to the INAI area), and 4.2 acres were considered "moderate quality". In 2021, most of the prairie was expected to be demolished as part of the Chicago Rockford International Airport's expansion plans and the northern part of the prairie was irreversibly disturbed by construction activities. Environmental organizations, ecologists, and conservationists working to stop construction within the prairie area argued that the Greater Rockford Airport Authority could redesign the expansion plan without impacting the high quality prairie. After the Natural Land Institute filed a lawsuit against the airport board and several governmental agencies in October 2021, the airport halted construction to begin a renewed round of environmental consultation with the U.S. Fish and Wildlife Service. When construction activities were authorized to continue in March 2023, the southern portion was bifurcated by bulldozer in preparation for an access road on March 9, 2023.

== History and naming ==
Prior to construction of the Chicago Rockford International Airport in 1954, the surrounding land was used by the U.S. Army as a military facility known as Camp Grant. The bowl-shaped form of the prairie provided a "natural amphitheater" for large gatherings. The prairie was named for its shape and for camp commandant General George Bell. Camp Grant was active between 1917 and 1946. The land was transferred to the Greater Rockford Airport Authority, a public taxing agency in Winnebago County, in 1948.

Since the 1950s, the Natural Land Institute and other organizations such as Byron Forest Preserve District, Illinois Department of Natural Resources, Boone County Conservation District, Winnebago Forest Preserve District, Rockford Park District, Winnebago County Soil and Water Conservation District, Pheasants Forever, and The Nature Conservancy have assisted with ecological restoration and management of the prairie areas.

== Impacts: Midfield Air Cargo Development ==
In November 2019, the Chicago Rockford International Airport wrapped up an environmental approval process for a planned expansion of the airport, including a one million square foot cargo facility, aircraft taxiways and truck parking areas, roads, and stormwater detention facilities to accommodate the new impervious surfaces. Most of Bell Bowl Prairie was planned to be destroyed as part of this development effort.

Airport construction was halted until November 1st, 2021 due to the documented presence of the federally Endangered rusty patched bumble bee (Bombus affinis). Other Threatened and Endangered species known to occur at Bell Bowl Prairie include the black-billed cuckoo (Coccyzus erythropthalmus), large-flowered beardtongue (Penstemon grandiflorus), and the prairie dandelion (Nothocalais cuspidata). The Environmental Assessment inventory did not include these species in the findings. The inventory was conducted in late August. Large-flowered beardtongue and prairie dandelion flower in the spring. The rusty patched bumble bee was similarly not documented in the 2019 Environmental Assessment.

Environmental organizations, ecologists, and conservationists began working to stop construction within the prairie area. They argued that the airport could redesign the expansion plan without impacting the high quality prairie. John White, Illinois ecologist and designer of the Illinois Natural Areas Inventory in the 1970s, stated that transplanting the prairie to another location is not a viable method to mitigate the impact. According to state botanist Paul Marcum, "If you try to dig it up, it will fall apart".

On October 26, 2021, the Natural Land Institute filed a lawsuit, asking for an emergency injunction prevent destruction of the prairie, which was scheduled for the following Monday. On October 28, the airport issued a statement that construction within the prairie would be on hold until March 2022, after which construction was scheduled to begin again.

In March 2022, the Federal Aviation Administration stated construction would continue to be on pause until June 1st, 2022.

In March 2023, the Federal Aviation Administration published a "Written Reevaluation" of the project, claiming that the proposed construction activities were "not expected to result in adverse effects to" the rusty patched bumble bee, allowing the project to move forward.

A portion of the highest quality part of the prairie was bulldozed on March 9, 2023, for the construction of an access road. Local conservation and land management agencies plan to conduct a "joint sod rescue" in order to salvage some of the remaining plants and soil for transplanting at a nearby preserve.

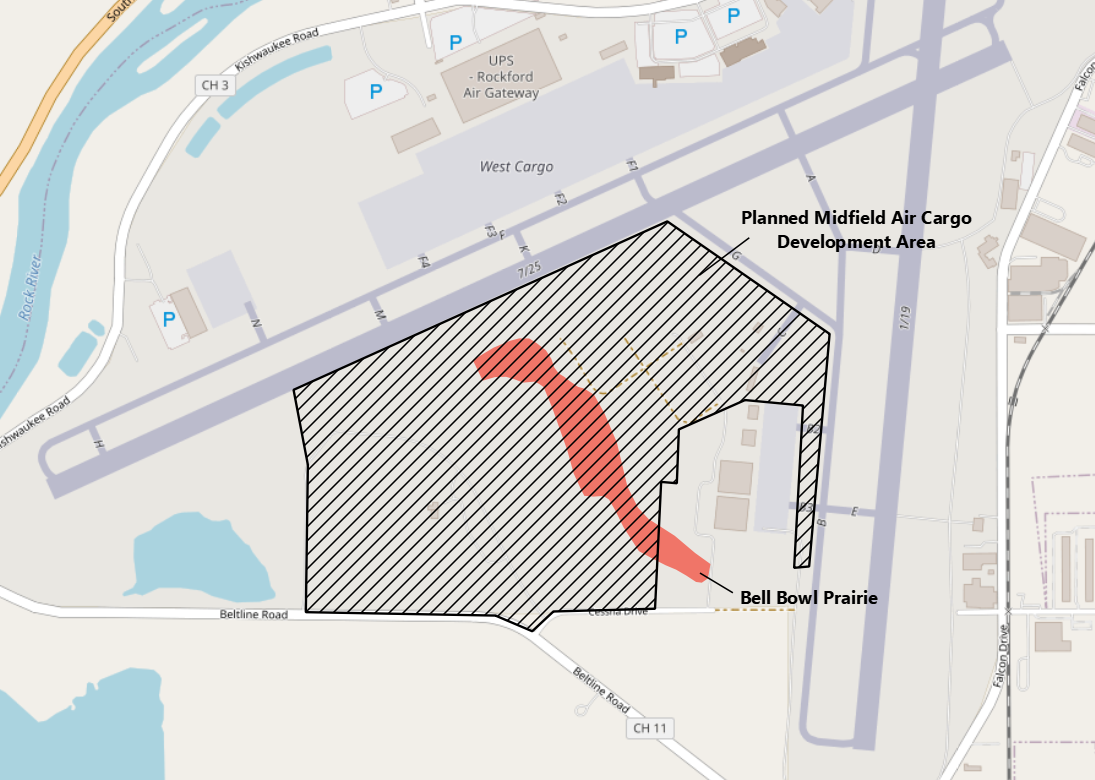
Bell Bowl Prairie and planned Chicago Rockford International Airport development area

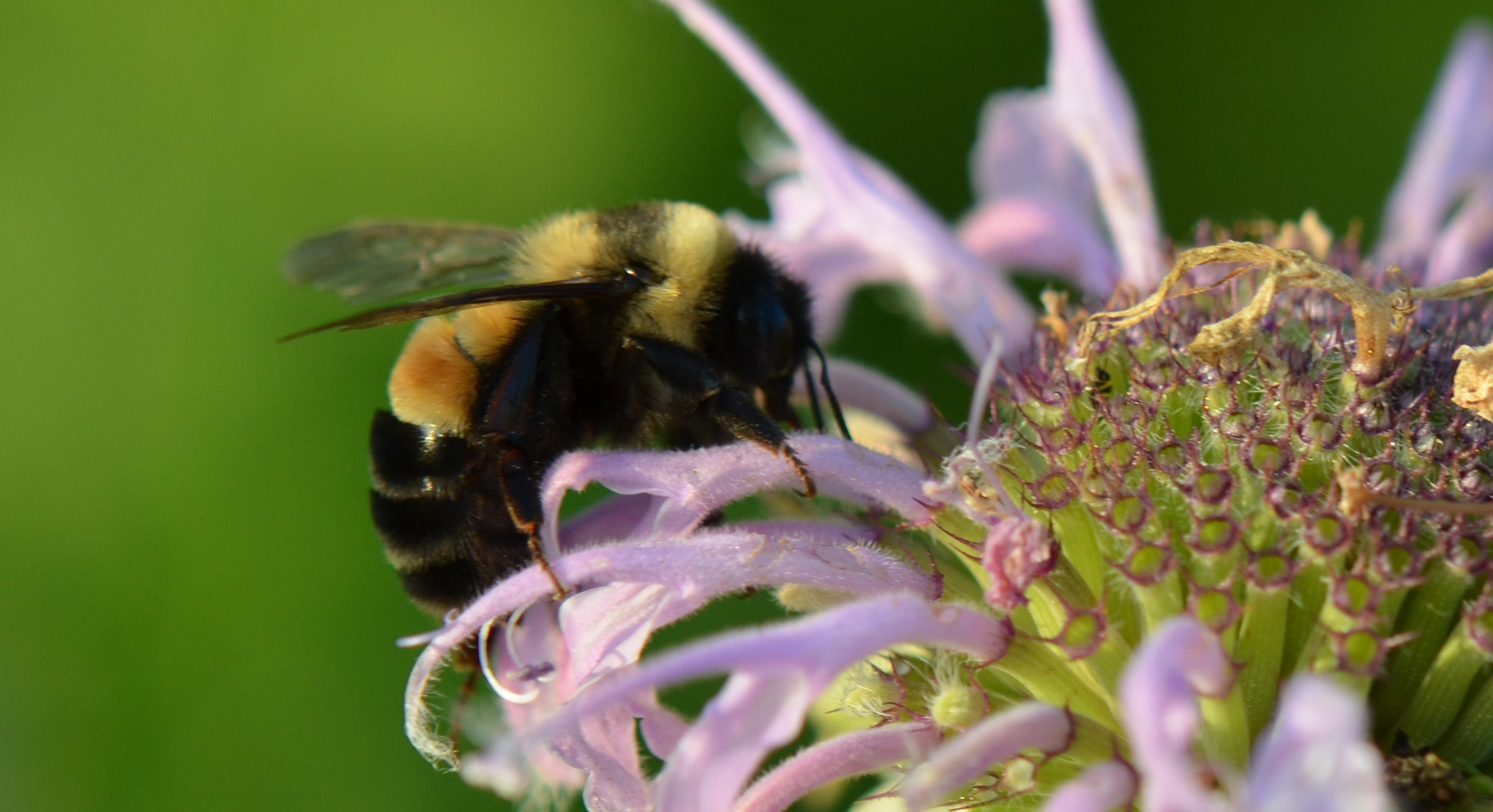
Rusty patched bumble bee (Bombus affinis)

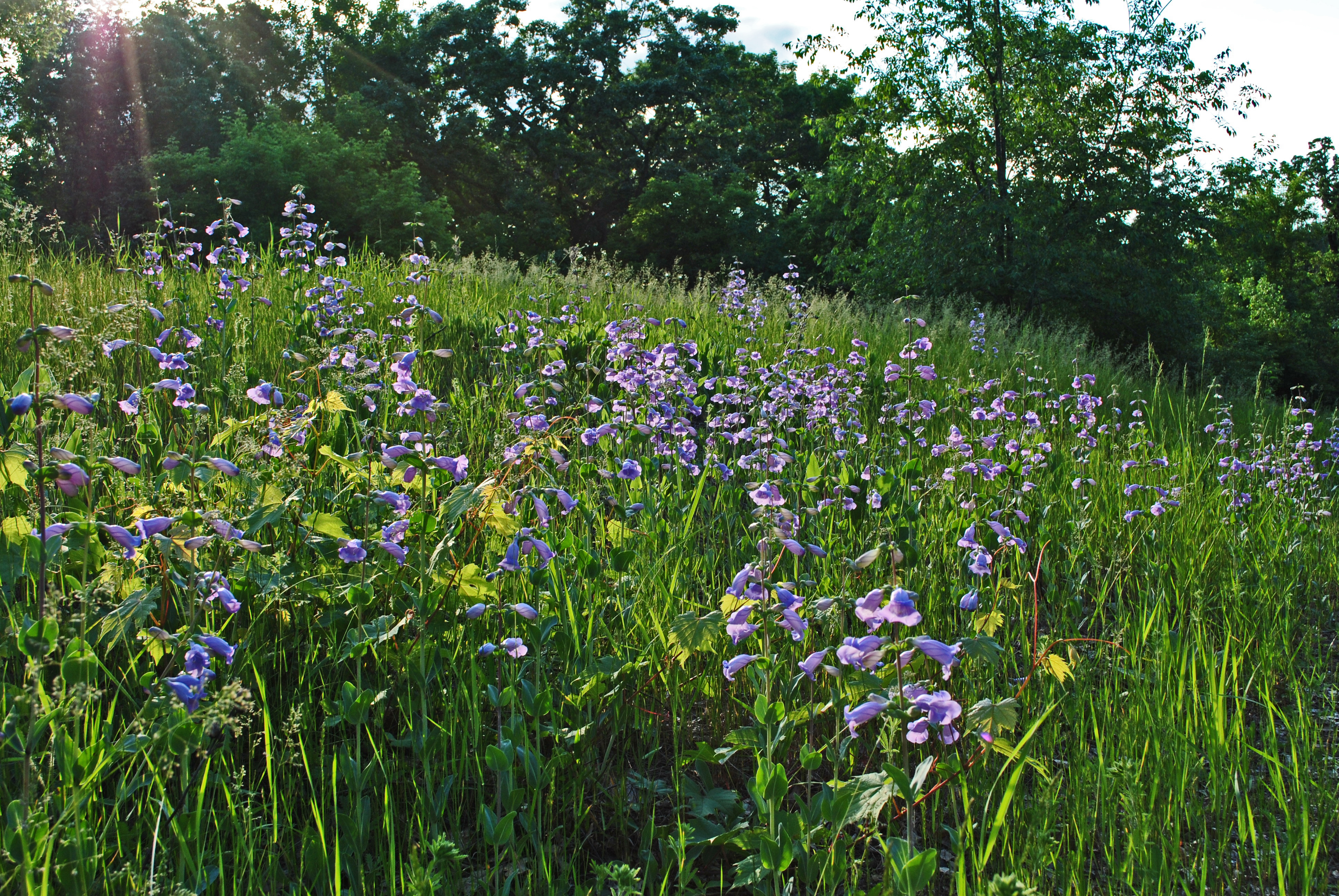
Large-flowered beardtongue (Penstemon grandiflorus)

== Flora ==
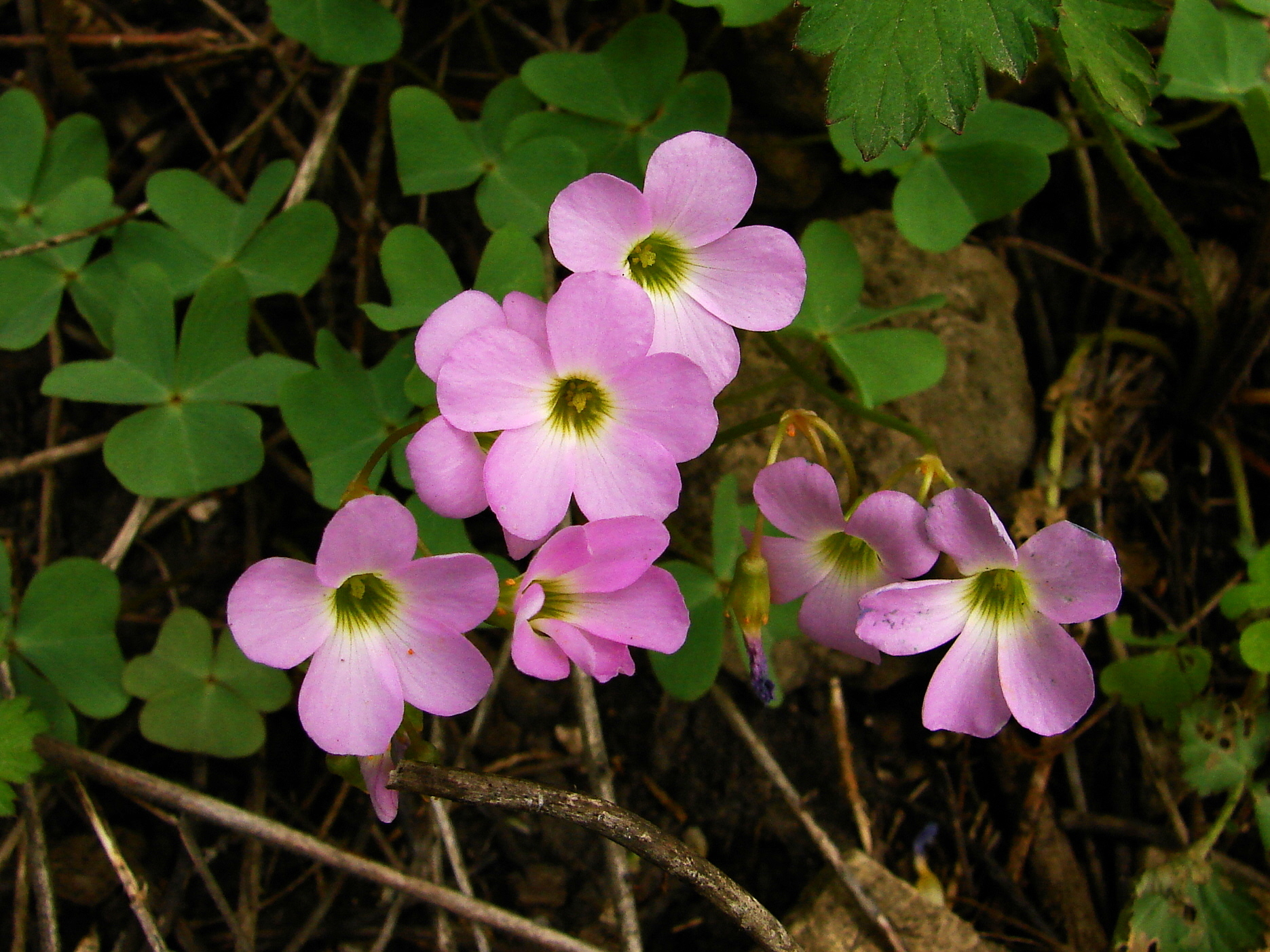
Violet wood-sorrel, Oxalis violacea: ten species of bees are known to visit the flowers of this species in Chicago region prairies

A one-day floristic inventory in late August 2018, part of the Environmental Assessment, identified 102 species of vascular plants (66 native). Among these included species with high coefficients of conservatism such as leadplant (Amorpha canescens), prairie tickseed (Coreopsis palmata), prairie cinquefoil (Drymocallis arguta), violet wood-sorrel (Oxalis violacea), wild quinine (Parthenium integrifolium), and prairie dropseed (Sporobolus heterolepis).

Missing from the 2018 inventory included in environmental assessments, but documented by others at Bell Bowl Prairie since, are high quality and state Endangered species such as the large-flowered beardtongue (Penstemon grandiflorus) and prairie dandelion (Nothocalais cuspidata). Illinois state law does not protect rare, threatened, or endangered plant species from destruction by the landowner; the Illinois Department of Natural Resources offers a consultation process but "lacks the authority to require organizations to follow through on any mitigation steps it outlines".
