= Sheila Colla =

Canadian entomologist and conservationist (1982–2025)

- Born: 4 May 1982; East York, Ontario, Canada
- Died: 6 July 2025 (aged 43)
- Resting place: St. John's Norway Cemetery
- Awards: C. Gordon Hewitt Award; NSERC Award for Science Promotion; King Charles III Coronation Medal

Academic background
- Education: University of Toronto (BSc); York University (PhD)
- Thesis: The Ecology and Conservation of Eastern North American Bumblebees (2012)
- Doctoral advisor: Laurence Packer

Academic work
- Discipline: Conservation biology
- Sub-discipline: Melittology

Sheila Rafaella Colla (4 May 1982 – 6 July 2025) was a Canadian conservation biologist specialising in wild bumblebees, and an advocate for increasing diversity in entomology. Her work with the rusty patched bumblebee led to the first listing of a bumblebee as endangered in both Canada and the United States.

== Early life and education ==
Sheila Rafaella Colla was born 4 May 1982 in East York, Toronto to parents who came from Trinidad and Italy and were teachers. She was brought up in the Greater Toronto area of Canada. She was interested in nature from a young age and studied zoology at University of Toronto, graduating in 2005. She focused on biodiversity and went on to study for a doctoral degree in York University with Laurence Packer, graduating in 2012.

== Scientific career ==
Colla was appointed to York University in 2015, after working at University of Toronto between 2014 and 2015. She was a tenured assistant professor at York University, holding a research chair in interdisciplinary conservation science. She was also executive committee member at the university's Centre for Bee Ecology, Evolution, and Conservation.

Since 2004, Colla's research focused on bees, especially wild bee population biology, conservation and their roles as pollinators and in sustainable agriculture. In her PhD research, she recorded the decline in rusty patched bumblebee using museum specimens and field observations and used it to raise public awareness, resulting in this species being listed as endangered in the USA and Canada in 2012. The reasons for the very substantial decline of this species are partly understood.

Colla was the North American Coordinator for the IUCN Red List Bumblebee Specialist Group. Colla also studied community science programmes and stakeholder perception, including writing books about bumblebees for the general public. She was active in raising awareness of the need for more diversity within the academic community of entomologists.

Colla co-founded Bumble Bee Watch in 2014, a community science project with over 5,000 observers created to track and conserve North America's bumble bees that has received media attention. Her public outreach also addressed strategies for improving Canadian landscapes for insects, particularly in gardens and urban locations.

== Personal life ==
Colla married Marc Michalak in 2011. They had 2 children, born in 2013 and 2016. Colla died on 6 July 2025 of mesothelioma. She is buried in St. John's Norway Cemetery in Toronto.

== Publications ==
Colla was the author or co-author of 3 books, 2 book chapters and over 50 scientific publications. The books include:

- Johnson, Lorraine; Colla, Sheila (2023). A Northern Gardener's Guide to Native Plants and Pollinators. Washington, DC: Island Press. ISBN 978-1-64283-299-0.
- Johnson, Lorraine; Colla, Sheila (2022). A Garden for the Rusty-patched Bumblebee: Creating Habitat for Native Pollinators. Madeira Park, BC: Douglas & McIntyre. ISBN 978-1-77162-323-0.
- Williams, Paul; Thorp, Robbin W.; Richardson, Leif; Colla, Sheila (2014). Bumble Bees of North America: An Identification Guide. Princeton, NJ: Princeton University Press. ISBN 978-0-691-15222-6.

Colla's scientific publications include:

- MacPhail, Victoria J.; Hatfield, Richard; Colla, Sheila R. (22 May 2024). "Bumble Bee Watch community science program increases scientific understanding of an important pollinator group across Canada and the USA". PLOS ONE. 19 (5) e0303335. Bibcode:2024PLoSO..1903335M. doi:10.1371/journal.pone.0303335. ISSN 1932-6203. PMC 11111064. PMID 38776282.
- MacPhail, Victoria J.; Colla, Sheila R. (1 September 2020). "Power of the people: A review of citizen science programs for conservation". Biological Conservation. 249 108739. Bibcode:2020BCons.24908739M. doi:10.1016/j.biocon.2020.108739. hdl:10315/37823. ISSN 0006-3207.
- Kerr, Jeremy T.; Pindar, Alana; Galpern, Paul; Packer, Laurence; Potts, Simon G.; Roberts, Stuart M.; Rasmont, Pierre; Schweiger, Oliver; Colla, Sheila R.; Richardson, Leif L.; Wagner, David L.; Gall, Lawrence F.; Sikes, Derek S.; Pantoja, Alberto (10 July 2015). "Climate change impacts on bumblebees converge across continents". Science. 349 (6244): 177–180. Bibcode:2015Sci...349..177K. doi:10.1126/science.aaa7031. PMID 26160945.
- Bartomeus, Ignasi; Ascher, John S.; Wagner, David; Danforth, Bryan N.; Colla, Sheila; Kornbluth, Sarah; Winfree, Rachael (20 December 2011). "Climate-associated phenological advances in bee pollinators and bee-pollinated plants". Proceedings of the National Academy of Sciences. 108 (51): 20645–20649. Bibcode:2011PNAS..10820645B. doi:10.1073/pnas.1115559108. PMC 3251156. PMID 22143794.
- Colla, Sheila R.; Packer, Laurence (1 June 2008). "Evidence for decline in eastern North American bumblebees (Hymenoptera: Apidae), with special focus on Bombus affinis Cresson". Biodiversity and Conservation. 17 (6): 1379–1391. Bibcode:2008BiCon..17.1379C. doi:10.1007/s10531-008-9340-5. ISSN 1572-9710.

== Awards and honours ==
Colla was awarded the Entomological Society of Canada C. Gordon Hewitt Award in 2021 for outstanding contribution to entomology in Canada within 12 years of being awarded a PhD., the President's Research Impact Award from York University in 2024 for the way her research had influenced government policy, an Ontario Nature Education award in 2024 and the NSERC Award for Science Promotion in 2024 She received the King Charles III Coronation Medal in 2025.

Colla's 2014 book Bumble Bees of North America: An Identification Guide was listed on the American Library Association's Outstanding References Sources list in 2015.
