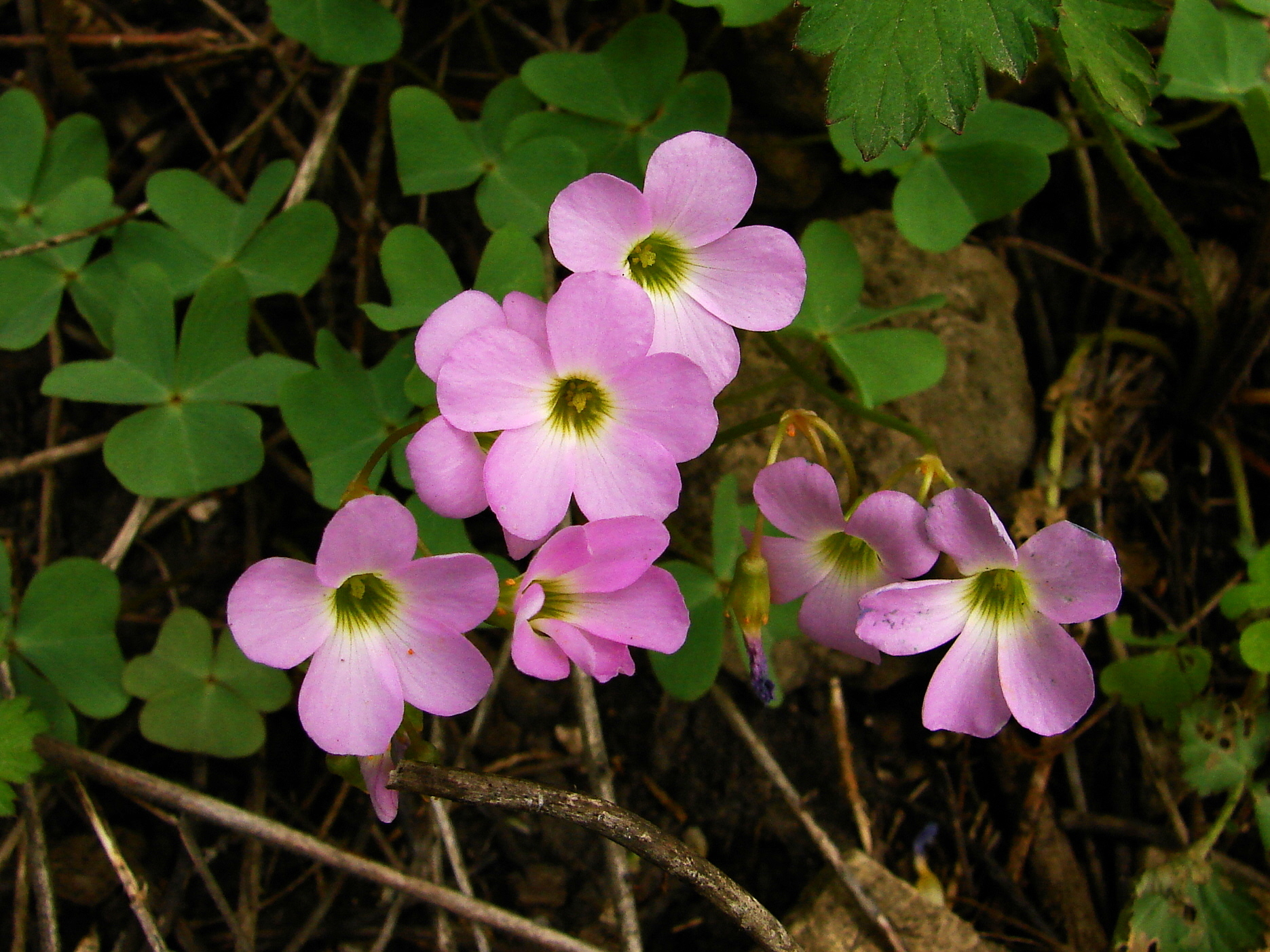

Conservation status
- Secure (NatureServe)

Scientific classification
- Kingdom: Plantae
- Clade: Tracheophytes
- Clade: Angiosperms
- Clade: Eudicots
- Clade: Rosids
- Order: Oxalidales
- Family: Oxalidaceae
- Genus: Oxalis
- Species: O. violacea

Binomial name
- Oxalis violacea L.

Synonyms
- Ionoxalis violacea (L.) Small; Oxalis violacea L. var. trichophora Fassett; Sassia violacea (L.) Holub

= Oxalis violacea =

Species of flowering plant

Oxalis violacea, the violet wood-sorrel, is a perennial plant and herb in the family Oxalidaceae. It is native to the eastern and central United States.

== Description ==
Oxalis violacea emerges in early spring from an underground bulb and produces leaf stems 7–13 cm (2 3/4–5 in) tall and flower umbels, or clusters, with up to 19 flowers on stems 9–23 cm (3 1/2–9 in) tall. The three-part leaves have heart-shaped leaflets. The plant is similar in appearance to small clovers such as the shamrock.

The plant bears lavender to white flowers 1–2 cm (1/2–3/4 in) wide with white to pale green centers above the foliage, during April or May, rarely to July, and, with rain, sometimes produces additional flowers without leaves from August to October.

== Etymology ==
The genus name, Oxalis, is from the Greek word oxys, which means "sharp" and refers to the sharp or sour taste from the oxalic acid present in the plant. The specific epithet, violacea, is Latin for violet-colored.

== Distribution and habitat ==
It is native plant in much of the United States, from the Rocky Mountains east to the Atlantic Ocean and Gulf of Mexico coasts, and through Eastern Canada. It has a tendency to cluster in open places in damp woods and on stream banks, and in moist prairies.

== Conservation ==
The plant's conservation status is globally secure; however, it is listed as endangered in Massachusetts and Rhode Island, threatened in New York, and a species of special concern in Connecticut. It is presumed extirpated in Michigan.

== Uses ==
=== Medicinal ===
Oxalis violacea was used as a medicinal plant by Native Americans, including the Cherokee and Pawnee peoples.

=== Culinary ===
All parts of the plant are edible – flowers, leaves, stems, and bulb. Oxalis is from the Greek word meaning sour, and this plant has a sour juice. It is used in salads. Moderate use of plant is advisable, as it should not be eaten in large quantities due to a high concentration of oxalic acid, ("salt of lemons") which can be poisonous.

It was a traditional food source of the Native American Apache, Cherokee, Omaha, Pawnee, and Ponca peoples.

=== Cultivation ===
Oxalis violacea is cultivated as an ornamental plant, for use as a flowering groundcover or perennial plant in traditional and native plant gardens, and for natural landscaping projects. It spreads rapidly by runners and bulbs. In gardens the plant prefers partial shade and moisture.
