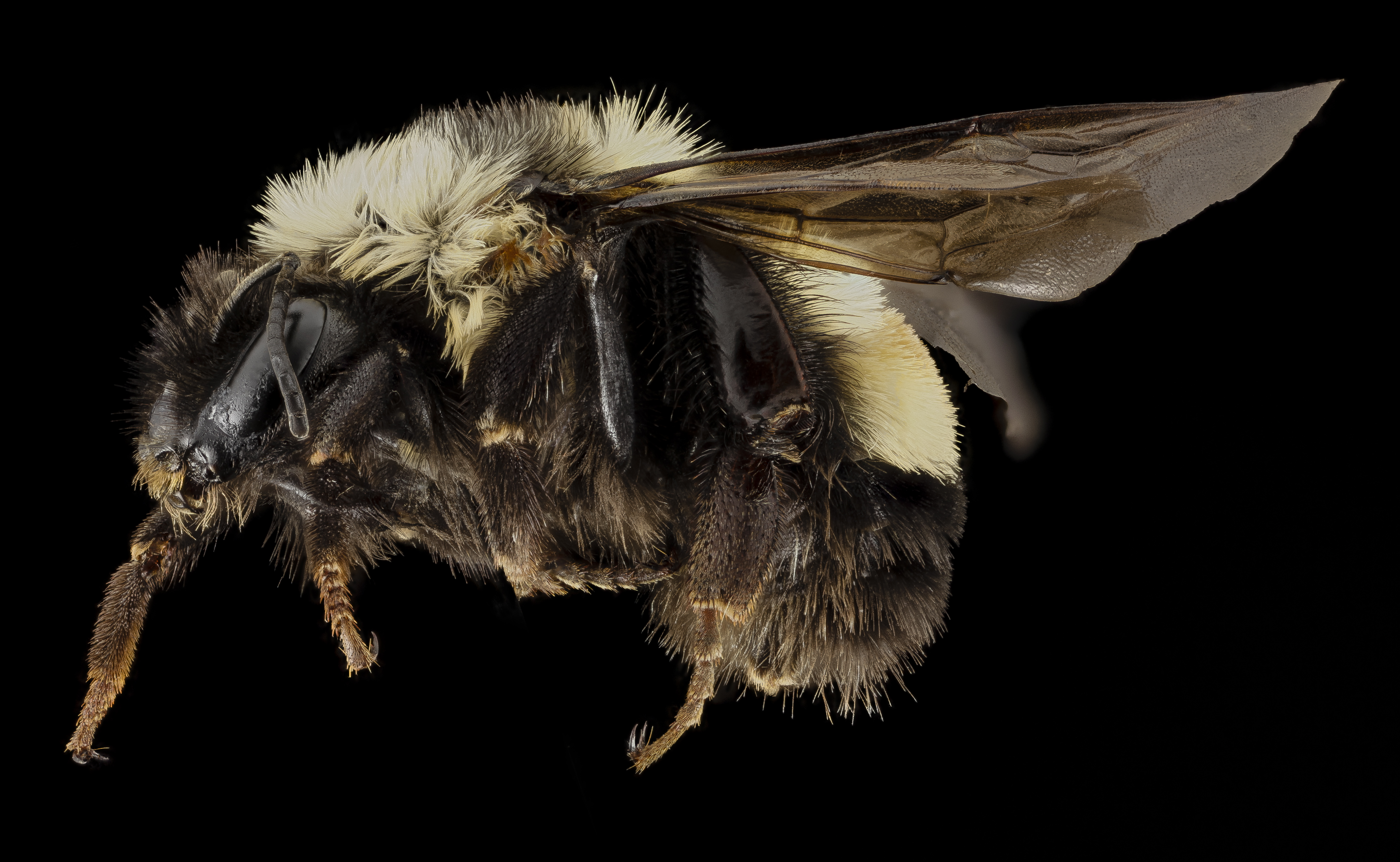
- worker of B. affinis

Conservation status
- Critically Endangered (IUCN 3.1)

Scientific classification
- Kingdom: Animalia
- Phylum: Arthropoda
- Clade: Pancrustacea
- Class: Insecta
- Order: Hymenoptera
- Family: Apidae
- Tribe: Bombini
- Genus: Bombus
- Subgenus: Bombus
- Species: B. affinis

Binomial name
- Bombus affinis Cresson, 1863
- The past range of Bombus affinis

= Bombus affinis =

Species of bee

Bombus affinis, commonly known as the rusty patched bumble bee, is a species of bumblebee endemic to North America. Its historical range in North America has been throughout the east and upper Midwest of the United States, north to Ontario, Canada, where it is considered a "species at risk", east to Quebec, south to Georgia, and west to the Dakotas. Its numbers have declined in 87% of its historical habitat range. In April 2010 it was assessed as Endangered in Canada, through the work of Sheila Colla and colleagues. On January 10, 2017, the United States Fish and Wildlife Service placed B. affinis on the list of endangered species, making the rusty patched bumble bee the first bee to be added to the list in the continental United States (seven species of yellow-faced bees native to the Hawaiian islands were added in 2016).

Members of B. affinis are relatively large in size, and like other species of bumblebees, are known to be eusocial organisms. Most nests constructed by B. affinis are built underground, and are commonly found in old rodent burrows. Nests created in captivity can house up to 2,100 members, but they are typically much smaller in the wild. This species consumes nectar and pollen from a variety of plants, including Abelia grandiflora, Asclepias syriaca, and Linaria spp. The colony odor is very similar to that of Bombus terricola, which makes it difficult for predators and parasites to differentiate between the two species.

== Taxonomy and phylogeny ==
B. affinis is a member of the subfamily Apinae, and is most closely related phylogenetically to B. franklini, which is another species of bumble bee endemic to North America. B. affinis is in the company of nearly 250 other species of bumblebee worldwide in the genus Bombus, although only 50 are native to parts of the US and Canada. Unlike some other members of the genus Bombus, B. affinis workers and queens are characterized by slightly different color patterns, which allow observers to tell them apart (the black thoracic spot is larger in workers, reaching the sides of the thorax). This species' genome was recently sequenced as part of the Beenome100 project.

== Description and identification ==
=== Morphology ===
Large differences are seen in morphology between both queens and workers, and males. Queens are about 20–22 mm (0.79–0.87 in) in length and 9–11 mm (0.35–0.43 in) in width, which is larger than workers that are typically about 10–16 mm (0.39–0.63 in) in length and 6–9 mm (0.24–0.35 in) in width. Both queens and workers have black hair that covers the head, much of their legs, and the bottom of the abdomen. They also both have black hair on the majority of the abdomen, except for the two basal segments. Workers have a slight mixing of yellow and black hairs near the base of the wings, which forms a discernible "V" shape, as well as a rust-colored patch of hair on the basal half of the second abdominal segment. Thus, while workers and queens share similarities in certain aspects of coloration, also differences occur in body size and the presence or absence of rust-colored patches of hair. Regardless of the caste within the colony, all members of B. affinis have significantly shorter tongues than any other species of bumblebee. Because of its body size and furry appearance, however, this bee is often confused with other species of bumblebee, such as B. citrinus, B. griseocollis, B. perplexus, and B. vagans.

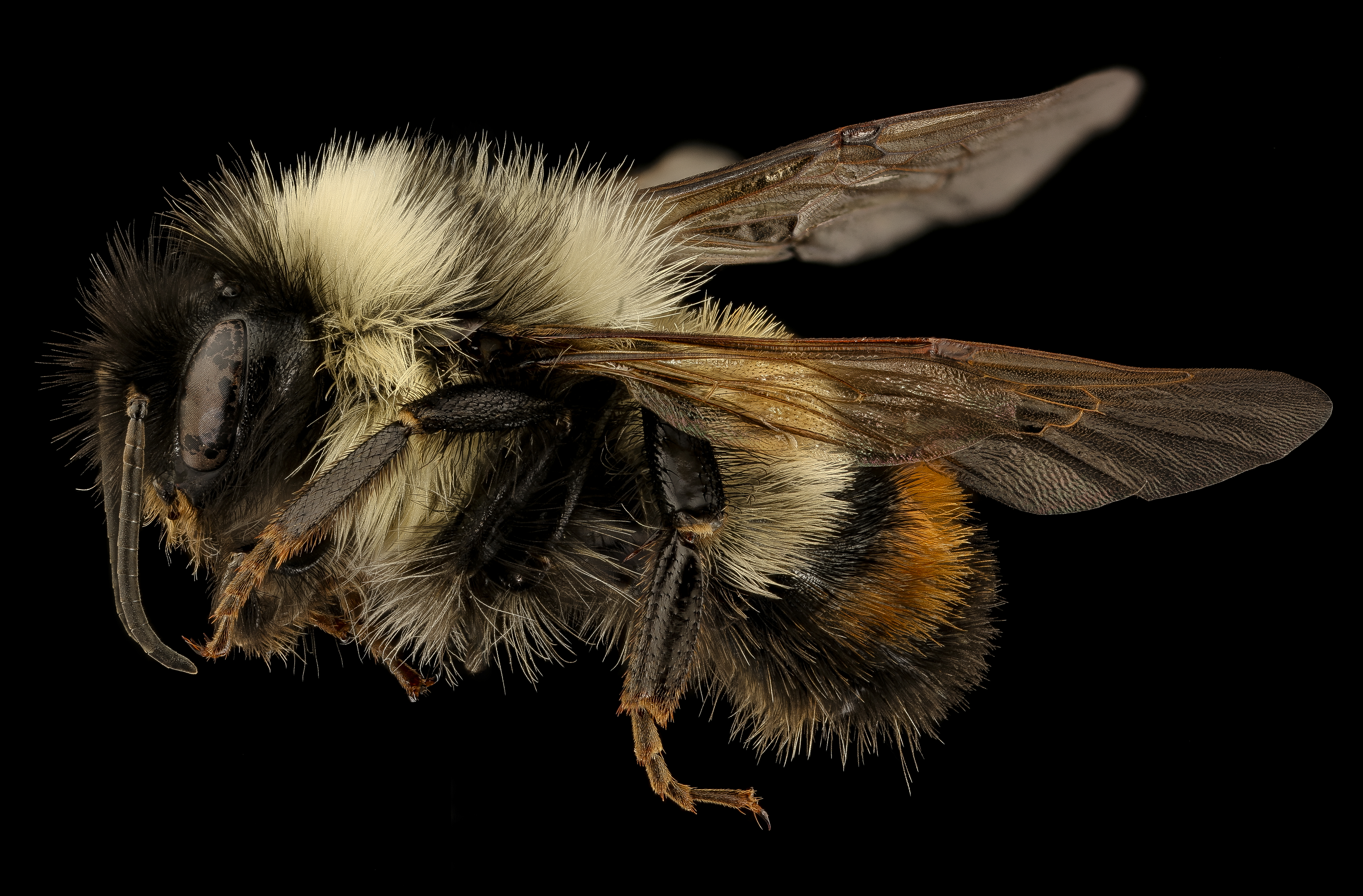
male of B. affinis

Furthermore, males and workers of B. affinis also differ in terms of their appearance and body size. Males are typically slightly larger than workers (13–17.5 mm (0.51–0.69 in) in length), and have a few off-white/pale hairs present on tops of their heads. They also have black hair which sometimes streaks across the tops of their abdomens (which are typically yellow). Finally, males can even have pale yellow hair on their abdomens, as opposed to the normal shade of yellow observed in workers and queens.

=== Nests ===
B. affinis are known to build their nests underground in locations such as ditches on the side of the road, wetlands, and fields. However, nests are sometimes constructed above ground in chunks of grass and soil, which can be limited by the availability of open grasslands. A B. affinis nest was once found inside an armchair that was abandoned outside. When nests are constructed underground, though, they are typically located 16–18 in (410–460 mm) below the surface, and are composed of soft soil.

== Distribution and habitat ==
B. affinis requires three different types of habitats (each for foraging, nesting, and hibernating) which are geographically close to one another, making this species particularly vulnerable to extinction. It requires a temperate climate, and can even withstand cold temperatures that most species of bumblebees cannot. In addition, B. affinis has been found at elevations as high as 1600 m. B. affinis is known to visit a number of sites for foraging, including sand dunes, farmland, marshes, and wooded areas. Members actively forage between April and October, thus requiring flowers to bloom for a long period of time. B. affinis nests are strikingly similar to other species of bees, which makes them difficult to locate. However, queen and workers work together to make individual cells and honey pots out of wax stores. In terms of their hibernating habitat, little information is known. B. affinis queens overwinter, but they most likely will live underground or burrow into rotting logs during the winter to survive. While B. affinis' habitat used to be highly prevalent, a large decline has occurred in recent years, possibly due to increased land development and agricultural use.

Until the 1980s, it was one of the most common species of bumblebee in southern Ontario. Since then, the species has had a drastic decline in number and is now difficult to find in its normal range. The last sightings reported within Ontario were in Pinery Provincial Park (Lambton County) in 2009, despite widespread surveys in Ontario. The Ontario Ministry of Natural Resources has begun a recovery project aimed at protecting the species and critical habitats centered in Pinery Provincial Park. These threats have been proposed as the cause of population decline: pathogen spillover from other species, pesticide use, and habitat fragmentation and loss. Surveys from 2001 to 2008 located B. affinis populations only in Illinois, Iowa, Maryland, and southern Ontario. Bell Bowl Prairie in Illinois is a known habitat of B. affinis; it was partially demolished in March 2023 to make way for an expansion of the Chicago Rockford International Airport.

== Colony cycle ==
=== Colony initiation and growth ===
New colonies are started by B. affinis in the spring and decline in the fall. Members of this species actually emerge before most other species of Bombus, and continue foraging after other species have begun hibernating. Solitary queens are the first to emerge and begin searching for a colony, while also collecting nectar and pollen to feed her future brood. The queen uses sperm she has saved from her mating activities of the previous fall to fertilize her eggs. Eggs hatch about four days after fertilization, but take up to 5 weeks to become completely developed adults depending on temperature and food availability. In the first few weeks after laying her brood, the queen is solely responsible for feeding her young. However, shortly afterwards, her female worker offspring begin collecting food for the colony in preparation for more offspring. Once the workers are able to become the primary caretakers of the nest, the queen can focus on laying more eggs. At this point (which is about halfway through the summer), the number of workers reaches an optimal number and the queen begins producing males and potential new queens. Colony sizes can range from 50 to 400 individuals, although colonies raised in captivity are known to get much larger, having as many members as 2100.

=== Colony decline ===
During this half-way point in the summer, any members with reproductive potential leave the nest and begin mating. The number of potential queens that can be produced is heavily reliant on the amount of nectar and pollen that can be gathered during this time. Thus, a shortage of food may result in lesser queen production, and vice versa. Because solitary queens are the only members of the B. affinis that can initiate new colonies, the success of future colonies is dependent on queen production. Furthermore, after mating, new queens rest and enter into diapause, or hibernation for the winter. Male members and workers decline as the weather gets colder, and eventually die when winter comes. Thus, colonies live for about 4–5 months depending on the environmental conditions. Queens commonly die at different times throughout colony production, which can often lead to orphaned colonies. Queens typically live for about 77 days on average.

== Reproductive suppression ==
Similar to other social insects, egg laying by B. affinis workers is suppressed by the presence of a dominant queen that is capable of reproducing. The queen's position as a dominant member or leader of the colony is made known through both pheromones and behavioral patterns. However, strictly the presence of specific pheromones suppresses gonadotropic hormones in B. affinis workers, leading to suppressed reproductive potential. Variability exists in dominance signals both between certain species, and also between subspecies or subgenera. For example, in B. terrestris colonies, presence or absence of abdominal glands rather than pheromones dictates the dominance of the queen. In the absence of a fecund queen, aggression and violence between workers increases quickly. In addition, ovarian weight is significantly lower in colonies where the queen is present than when she is removed.

Bombus bohemicus (an obligate brood parasite of B. affinis) was once thought to play a role in suppressing ovarian development in B. affinis, but this is not the case. Members of the subgenus Psithyrus often maul other members of the host colony, which indirectly decreases the number of eggs laid in the host colony. B. bohemicus does not demonstrate this behavior, and actually has worse chances of survival in nests where a dominant queen is not present, due to increased aggression by B. affinis members. However, while ovarian development is not impacted by the presence of B. bohemicus, overall reproductive success is decreased due to consumption of the host eggs and larval ejection.

== Kin selection ==
=== Genetic relatedness ===
Genetic relatedness within the B. affinis species varies depending on the relationship. Because members are haplodiploid making males haploid and females diploid, so genetic relatedness is asymmetrical, causing workers to be more closely related to their sisters than their brothers. B. affinis workers share a correlation coefficient (or variable indicating the strength of the relatedness/ degree of relatedness) of r = 0.75 with full sisters but only r = 0.25 for full brothers. In addition, workers are also much more closely related to their sons than their own brothers, and even more so than their nephews. The r value is likely greater than 0.5 for sons. While it is advantageous for ratio of males to queens to be 1:1 normally, this asymmetry in genetic relatedness results in much conflict between the queen and the workers. Thus, all members which are workers should demonstrate favor for a predominantly female population (if the queen is the major egg layer in the colony).

=== Worker/queen conflict ===
Differences in genetic relatedness can result in conflict between the B. affinis queen and workers. This conflict can manifest itself either through a skewed sex ratio with the absence of any physical aggression or through direct contact in which one member will act violently towards another member to inhibit reproductive success. Should aggression manifest itself as skewed sex ratios, the ratio of male to female offspring varies depending on the contribution from queens and workers. For example, if there is no worker contribution, the ratio will be 1:3 (males to females), however, if contribution is solely from workers, then the ratio be far closer to 1:1. However, should the aggression manifest itself as violent behaviors, they will often be directed toward a member's brood, through actions such as larval ejection. This larval ejection is often associated with the degradation of group cohesion, and typically occurs at a late stage in colony development. It can also be the result of workers attempt to lay their own eggs, independently of the queen.

== Interaction with other species ==
=== Parasites ===
B. affinis is parasitized most extensively by a separate species of bee, Bombus bohemicus, which is an obligate brood parasite. B. bohemicus ends hibernation shortly after B. affinis, and searches for their established nests, but the exact mechanism is unknown. Females of B. bohemicus are thought to be able to locate the host nests by identifying the odor from a distance—without ever having physical contact with the nest or regions that were used by workers. By flying low to the ground and searching carefully (even by looking near leaves and debris), B. bohemicus may first locate the entrance of a B. affinis nest, and then verify its findings by odor identification. After invading the nest, however, the B. bohemicus lives alongside the queen and the workers, and also attempts to rear its own brood (which must be raised with host workers' help). Because larger nests tend to have more workers defending the nest, B. bohemicus often invades smaller nests, which forces it to occupy smaller nests for a longer time. B. bohemicus is uniquely found in the nests of B. affinis and B. terricola, where it is usually tolerated if unnoticed. However, B. affinis has been known to exhibit oophagy (or consumption of nonhost eggs), larval ejection, and ejection of the parasite in response to parasite presence. Should B. bohemicus make a mistake in invading the nests of other species, they will be attacked by the queen, whose violent actions often end in their death.

=== Diet ===
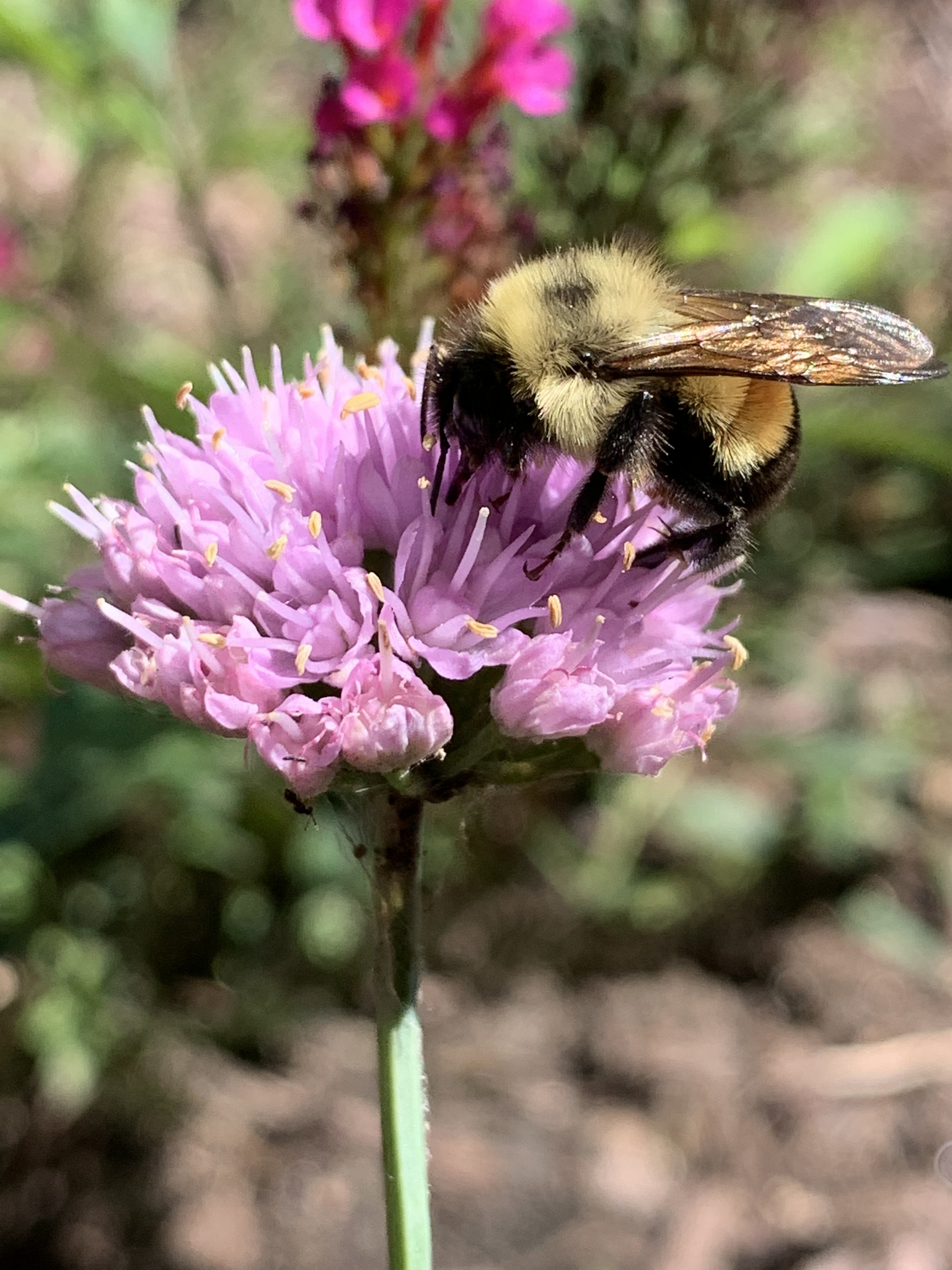
B. affinis consuming nectar

B. affinis consumes the nectar and pollen of a variety of nototrobic plant species, including Lobelia siphilitica, Linaria vulgaris, and Antirrhinum majus. Research published in 2022 identified several plant genera the flowers of which B. affinis commonly visited. These included plants in the genera Monarda, Eutrochium, Veronicastrum, Agastache, and Solidago. This research supported recommendations for plantings and habitat management to help conserve the bee species.

Dutchman's breeches (Dicentra cucullaria) is particularly dependent on members of the B. affinis for sexual reproduction. In fact, the flower structure and mechanism by which it is pollinated indicate that it is adapted to foragers such as B. affinis, which can separate the outer and inner petals of the flower. Members then use their front legs to expose the stigma, stamen, and anthers. Shortly afterwards, they sweep pollen in a forward stroke by using their middle legs, before leaving the flower to return to the colony with the pollen. In this way, D. cucullaria is pollinated as the bees move from plant to plant, and B. affinis meets its dietary needs. This pollen foraging behavior is strikingly similar to bees of the genus Apis. Species of the Apis are lighter in weight, though, making it slightly more difficult to gain access.

=== Disease ===
B. affinis is susceptible to a certain species of protozoa, known as Apicystis bombi. This pathogen affects about 3% of all B. affinis, and is particularly prevalent in Ontario. A. bombi first infects the gut of its host, then spreads this infection to the rest of the body. While its transmission is not well understood, A. bombi causes multiple negative effects, including increased death of worker bees, and the prevention of formation of new colonies. It also limits ovarian development of queens, and reduces their lifespans. This disease likely was introduced to North America by commercial B. terrestris in the early in early 2005 or 2006 when members invaded northern Patagonia, Argentina, from Europe. A. bombi rarely affects bees occupying Europe (only about 6-8% show signs of infection); however, for European bees living in Patagonia, incidence of infection is closer to about 50% in certain species. Because of this, conservation experts are concerned that A. bombi may be detrimental to several bumblebee species, including B. affinis.

== Importance in agriculture ==
B. affinis is important to the agricultural industry. This species pollinates up to 65 different genera of plants, and is the primary pollinator of key food crops, such as cranberries, plums, apples, onions, and alfalfa. These crops are important for day-to-day consumption by humans, but are also vital to sustaining birds and mammals that feed on their fruit. Plants pollinated by B. affinis (such as Aralia and Spiraea) are used medicinally by aboriginal peoples of Canada known as the First Nations. Thus, the recent decline of B. affinis could have far-reaching effects on ecosystems, economic stability, and cultural traditions.

In 2008, three recent events were reported to have led to the decline of B. affinis' agricultural role: pathogen spillover, pesticide use, and habitat loss. Many bumblebees used in commercial businesses harbor harmful parasites that can impact nearby wild populations of B. affinis. This often has lethal effects, and has led to the decline of B. terricola and B. impatiens, as well. Apart from pathogen spillover, novel pesticides also affect populations of B. affinis. Neonicotinoid pesticides are commonly used for pest control on crops and turf, but they are also toxic to bees. Because B. affinis nests are built underground, they are uniquely susceptible to this pesticide's use on turf. Lastly, increases in urbanization and industrialization have meant the loss of native habitats. While other species such as B. bimaculatus, the two-spotted bumble bee, have adapted well to urban environments, B. affinis has not. Whether the reduction of native food plants in particular has affected B. affinis is not known.

== See also ==
- List of bumblebee species
