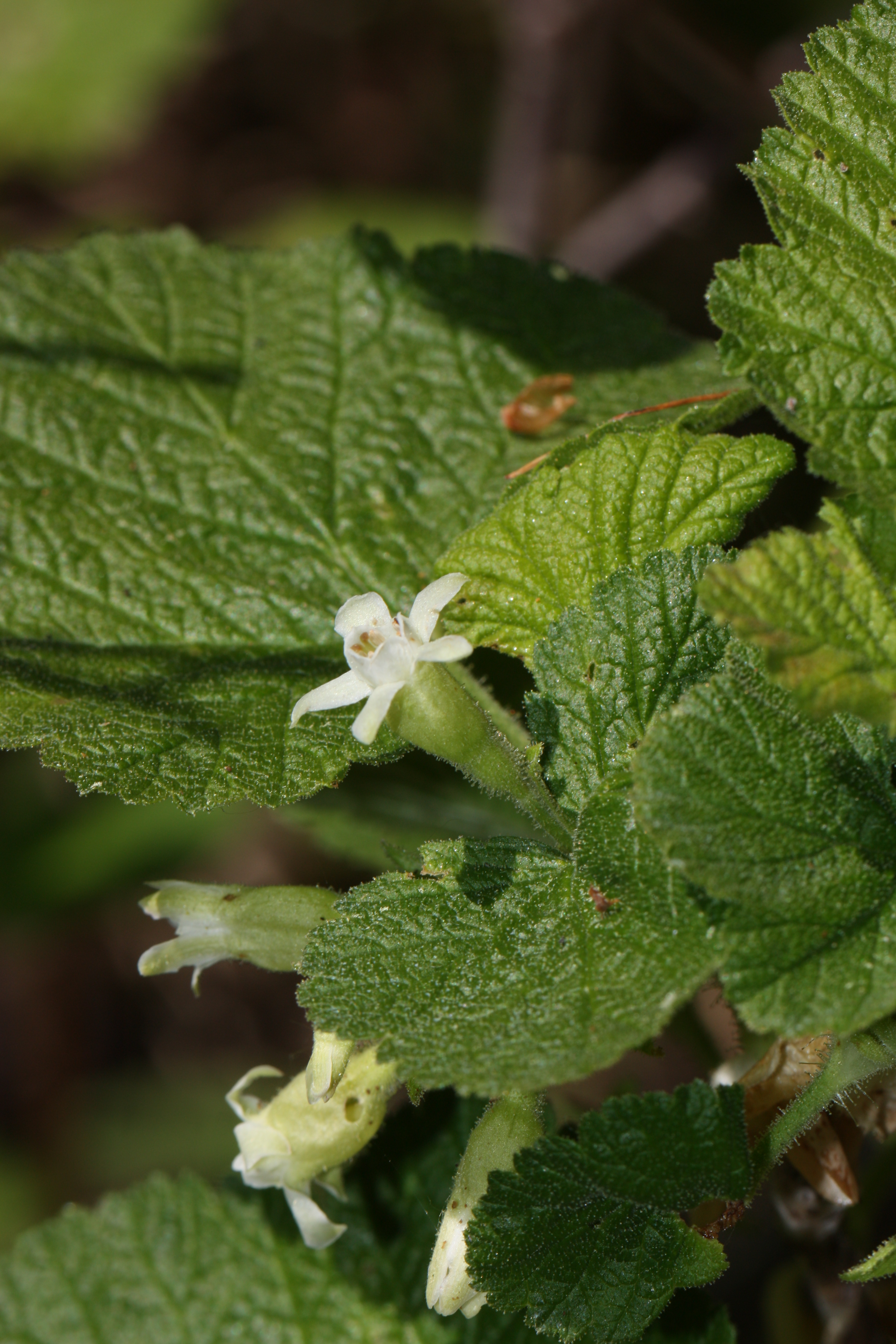
- A sticky currant growing in Wenatchee National Forest

Conservation status
- Secure (NatureServe)

Scientific classification
- Kingdom: Plantae
- Clade: Tracheophytes
- Clade: Angiosperms
- Clade: Eudicots
- Order: Saxifragales
- Family: Grossulariaceae
- Genus: Ribes
- Species: R. viscosissimum

Binomial name
- Ribes viscosissimum Pursh, 1813

Synonyms
- Coreosma viscosissima (Pursh) Spach (1835); Ribes hallii Jancz. (1906); Ribes viscosissimum var. hallii (Jancz.) Jancz. (1907); Ribes viscosissimum var. purshii Jancz. (1907)

= Ribes viscosissimum =

Sticky currant

North American species of currant

Ribes viscosissimum, also known as sticky currant, is a species of eudicot in the family Grossulariaceae (currant family). The species is native to North America.

== Description ==
Ribes viscosissimum is a dicot and a perennial plant growing to 1–2 metres (3 1/4–6 1/2 ft) in height, with a stem covered in sticky glandular hairs but lacking spines or bristles. It is resinous and fragrant. The leaves have thick, rough blades divided into three lobes with rounded, toothed tips, the lobes being approximately the same size. Typically, the blades are 8 cm (3 1/8 in) long, and the petioles are up to 10 cm (4 in) long.

Blooming in early summer, the inflorescence comprise erect or drooping clusters of 4–15 bell-shaped flowers. They have five whitish, green, or pink-tinged sepals that resemble a corolla at their tips, sometimes becoming reflexed. The stamens and stigmas are surrounded by whitish petals.

The berries are black, covered in bluish wax, and very gummy. Fruits are blue-black berries up to 1 cm (3/8 in) in length. They are unpalatable.

== Distribution and habitat ==
The species is native to North America. Pacific Northwest, Columbia Plateau, Great Plains, Great Basin, and southwest regions of western North America are native to this plant. It grows at montane to lower subalpine elevations, along streambanks, in damp to dry woods, on sagebrush plateaus and rocky slopes.

R. viscosissimum was found in the states of Idaho, Oregon and Washington in high quantity. In Oregon, they were found in Grant County. In a Strawberry Wilderness on Slide Basin trail #372 on lower switchback of trail to Slide Lake below ridge between Strawberry and Slide Basins. They were at an elevation of 2,020 m (6,620 ft). In Idaho they were found in Bonner County at Priest Lake State Forest, Selkirk Mountains, Laclede, Riley Creek Road, about 2.5 miles up Manley Creek Road. In Blaine County on trail to Amber Lakes from West Fork of North Fork of Big Wood River, north of Ketchum. In Caribou County at Caribou National Forest. Forest Road 95. From Hwy 34 drive up road 107 to Valley Creek. Along Forest Road 107 about 2.5 air miles SW of Stump Peak.

== Ecology ==
There have been reports of the following animal species as pollinators of this plant species or its genus where they overlap in geographical range: Bombus vagans, B. bifarius, B. centralis, B. fervidus, B. flavifrons, B. huntii, B. melanopygus, B. mixtus, B. nevadensis, B. terricola, B. sitkensis, and B. occidentalis.

== Conservation status ==
It is common, widespread, and abundant (although it may be rare in parts of its range). Not vulnerable in most of its range. Exhibits an intermediate range of ecological tolerance, typifies a stable phase of a native community, and persists but does not thrive with some natural or human disturbance

== Propagation ==
As soon as the seeds are mature in the autumn, they should be sowed in a cool body. Prior to sowing, cold stratifying stored seed at -2 to 0 °C for 3 months is commonly advised. Under normal garage conditions, the seed can last for 17 years or longer. Prick out the seedlings pots as soon as they are large enough to handle and grow them on in a cold frame for their first winter, putting them out in late spring the following year. Half-ripe wood cuttings, 10 – 15 cm with a heel, July/August in a body. November through February, in a cold body or sheltered mattress outside, cuttings of mature timber from the current year's boom, preferably with a heel from the previous year's increase. Its tree is a huge plant with a single trunk that grows in girth with age and branches that is not precisely defined but often exceeds four meters in height (which also grow in circumference with age).

== Allergenicity ==
The species has not been linked to any allergies, but is not edible.

== Sources ==
1. Species was collected on June 16, 1806, along the Lolo Trail in Idaho, by William Clark and Meriwether Lewis during their famous expedition. It was later described and published in Fl. Amer. Sept. (Pursh) 163. 1814.
2. The Plant List, Ribes viscosissimum var. hallii (Jancz.) Jancz.
3. Calflora taxon report, University of California, Ribes viscosissimum Pursh, Sticky Current, Sticky flowering currant, sticky currant
4. Biota of North America Program 2014 county distribution map
5. SEINet, Southwestern Biodiversity, Arizona chapter
6. Flora of North America, Ribes viscosissimum
7. Pursh, Frederick Traugott 1813. Flora Americae Septentrionalis 1: 163–164 description in Latin, commentary in English
