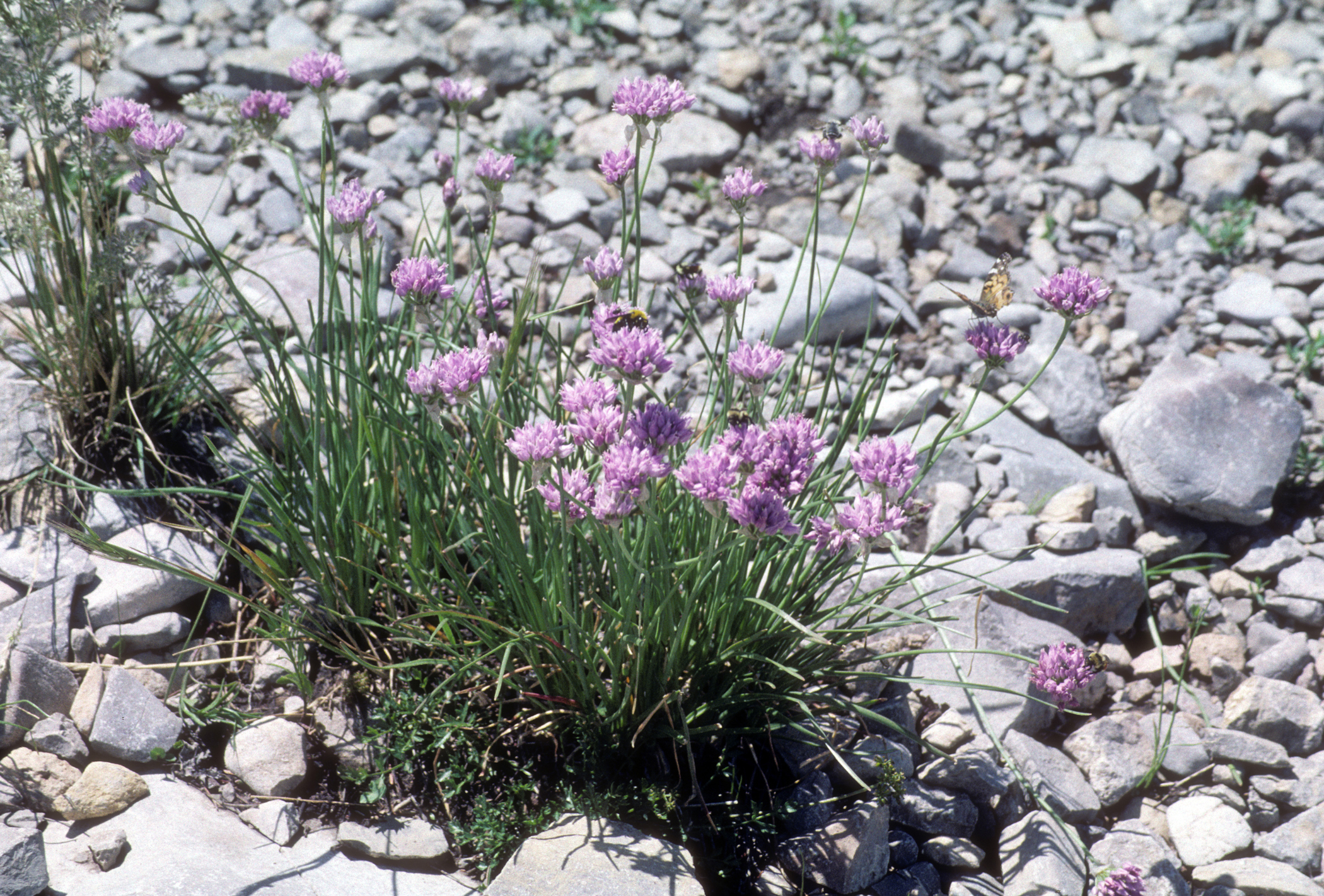

Conservation status
- Least Concern (IUCN 3.1)

Scientific classification
- Kingdom: Plantae
- Clade: Tracheophytes
- Clade: Angiosperms
- Clade: Monocots
- Order: Asparagales
- Family: Amaryllidaceae
- Subfamily: Allioideae
- Genus: Allium
- Subgenus: A. subg. Amerallium
- Species: A. geyeri

Binomial name
- Allium geyeri S.Wats.

Synonyms
- Allium dictyotum Greene; Allium funiculosum A.Nelson; Allium pikeanum Rydb.; Allium fibrosum Rydb. 1897, illegitimate homonym not Regel 1887; Allium arenicola Osterh. 1900, illegitimate homonym not Small 1900; Allium rubrum Osterh.; Allium sabulicola Osterh.; Allium rydbergii J.F.Macbr.

= Allium geyeri =

Geyer's onion

Species of flowering plant

Allium geyeri or Geyer's onion is a North American species of onion widespread in the western United States and in western Canada. It is found in the Rocky Mountain States from New Mexico to Idaho, Great Basin, the Pacific Northwest, Texas, South Dakota, Arizona, Manitoba, British Columbia, Alberta and Saskatchewan.

== Description ==
There are three varieties of the onion:

- Allium geyeri var. chatterleyi S.L.Welsh - Abajo Mountains in Utah
- Allium geyeri var. geyeri - much of species range
- Allium geyeri var. tenerum M.E.Jones - much of species range

Allium geyeri produces narrowly elongate bulbs up to 25 mm long. Flowering stalks can reach up to 50 cm in height. Flowers are bell-shaped to urn-shaped, pink to white with yellow pollen.

Allium geyeri, like many alliums, is pollinated by many varieties of bumble bee. Known pollinators of this onion include the Bombus bifarius, Bombus centralis, Bombus flavifrons, Bombus huntii, Bombus melanopygus, Bombus sylvicola, Bombus occidentalis, and Bombus bohemicus.
