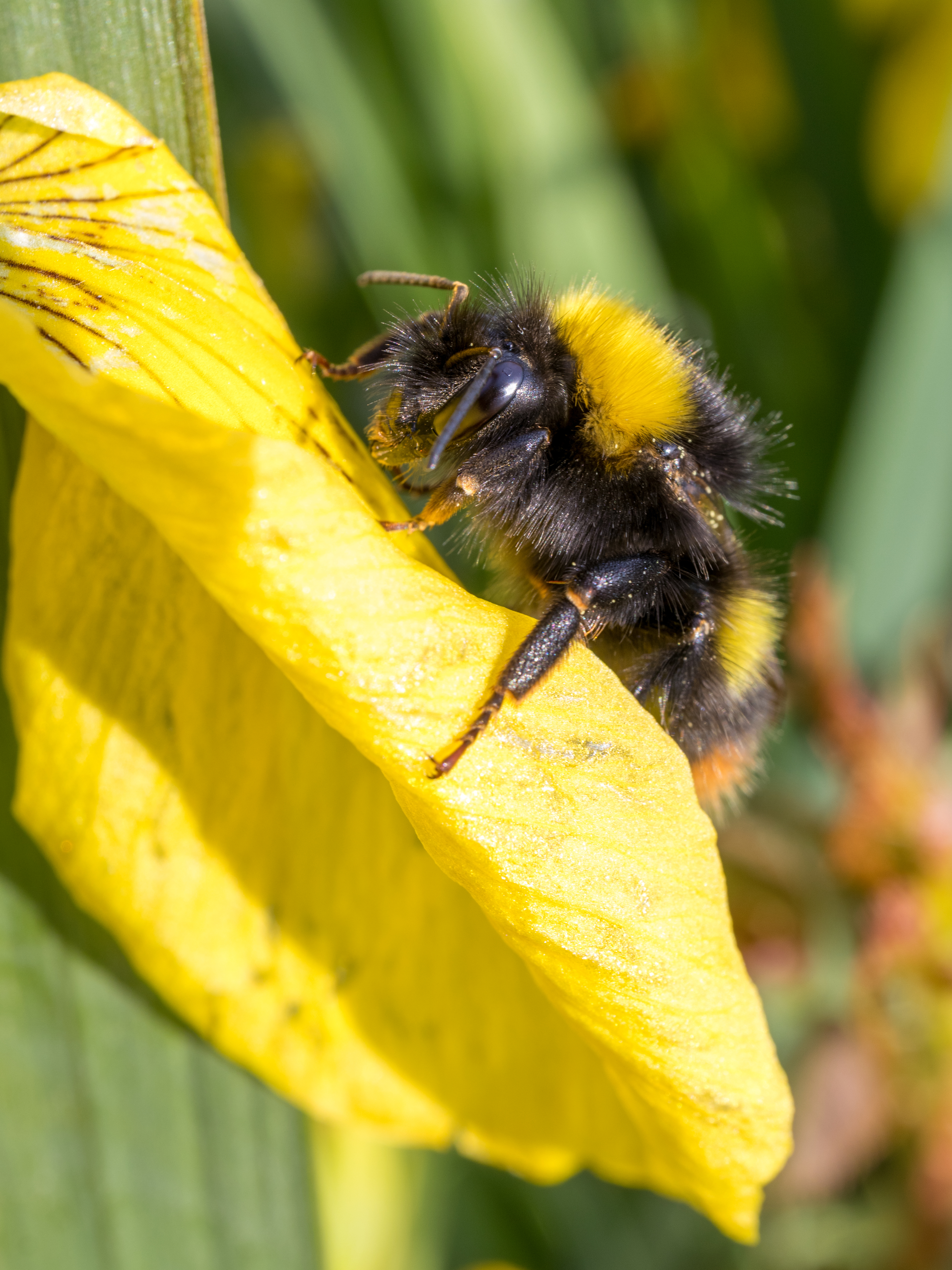
- Bombus pratorum

Scientific classification
- Kingdom: Animalia
- Phylum: Arthropoda
- Clade: Pancrustacea
- Class: Insecta
- Order: Hymenoptera
- Family: Apidae
- Genus: Bombus
- Subgenus: Pyrobombus; Dalla Torre, 1880

Type species
- Bombus hypnorum Linnaeus, 1758

= Pyrobombus =

Subgenus of bumblebees

Pyrobombus (known as fiery-tailed bees) is a subgenus of bumblebees, with centres of diversity in Central Asia and North America. Nearly a fifth of all Bombus species fall within Pyrobombus. Pyrobombus bees face issues such as climate change, habitat loss, urbanization, and industrial agriculture. They can be used for beekeeping as they are pollinators, and can be used for wax, honey, venom, and combs.

== Morphology ==
Pyrobombus bees are fairly small. The subgenus is the largest by number of species in Bombus and the most diverse in morphology. Species vary in characteristics such as tongue length, head shape, mouth parts, and wingspan. The coat colour is similar to bees in other subgenera, with black, yellow, and orange patterns; some species can have white patches or stripes. Like all bees, Pyrobombus have translucent wings that can be clear or tinted black, brown, or amber.

== Phylogeny ==
Studies have disagreed on whether Pyrobombus is monophyletic. Hines, Cameron, and Williams (2006) concluded that Pyrobombus was monophyletic based on an analysis of 36 of the 43 recognized species. Other studies have supported that Pyrobombus is paraphyletic and suggest the Pyrobombus belong in two different phyletic lines. Plowright and Stephen (1973) examined 18 different enzymes and found the taxon sample had close relationships with B. jonellus and B. frigidus. Their study aligned with other independent researchers.

== Habitat and nesting ==
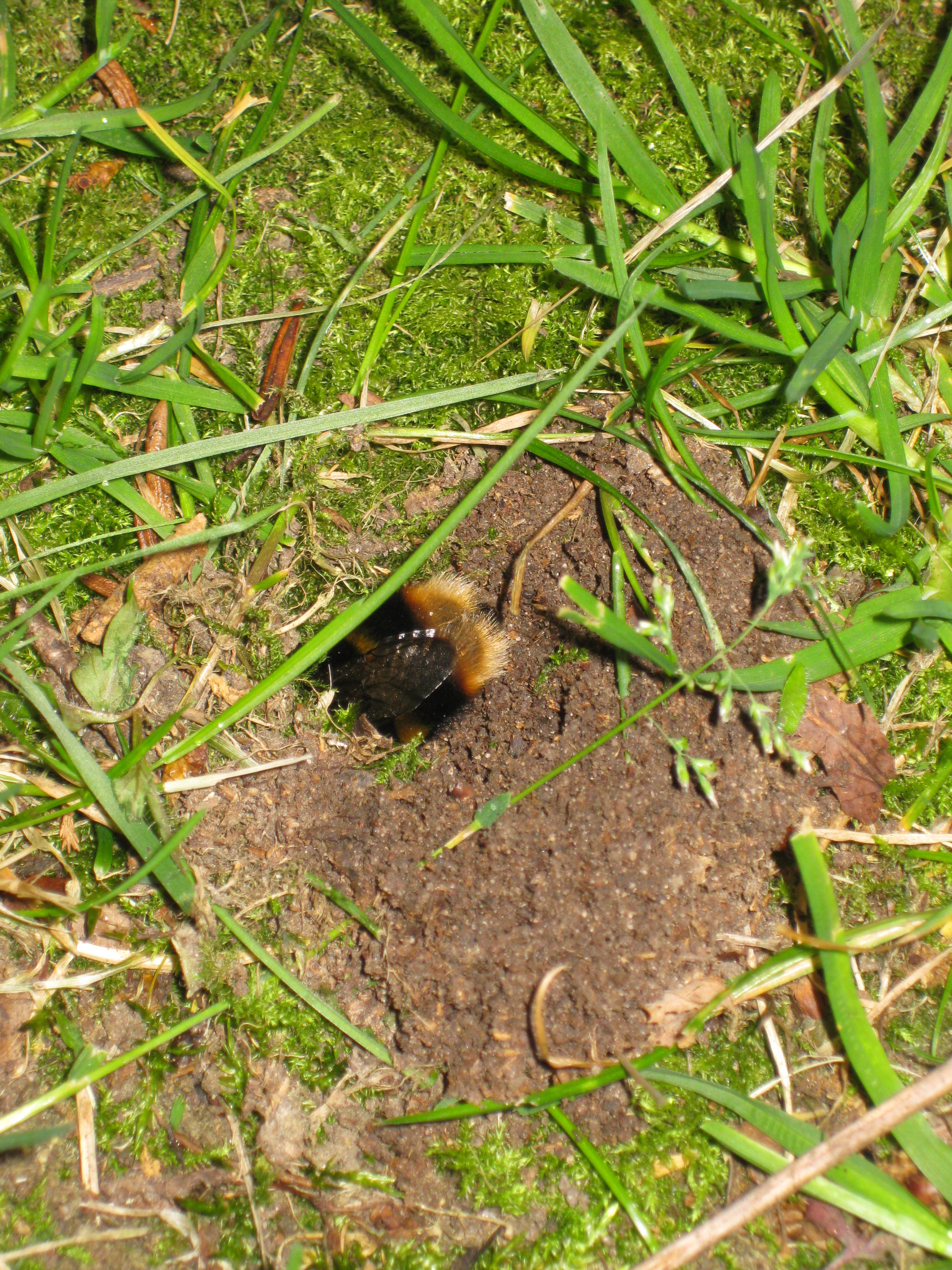
Underground bee nest

Pyrobombus commonly nest underground. Nest entrances are not elaborate. Generally, plant material is collected and accumulated around and in the nest canal for camouflage. This camouflage of its nest is also known as a pseudo-nest. They use this camouflage to avoid predators and protect against bad weather. These colonies will often be small with some species being flexible in their site preference. European Pyrobombus species tend to be more selective in site preference.

== Pollination ==
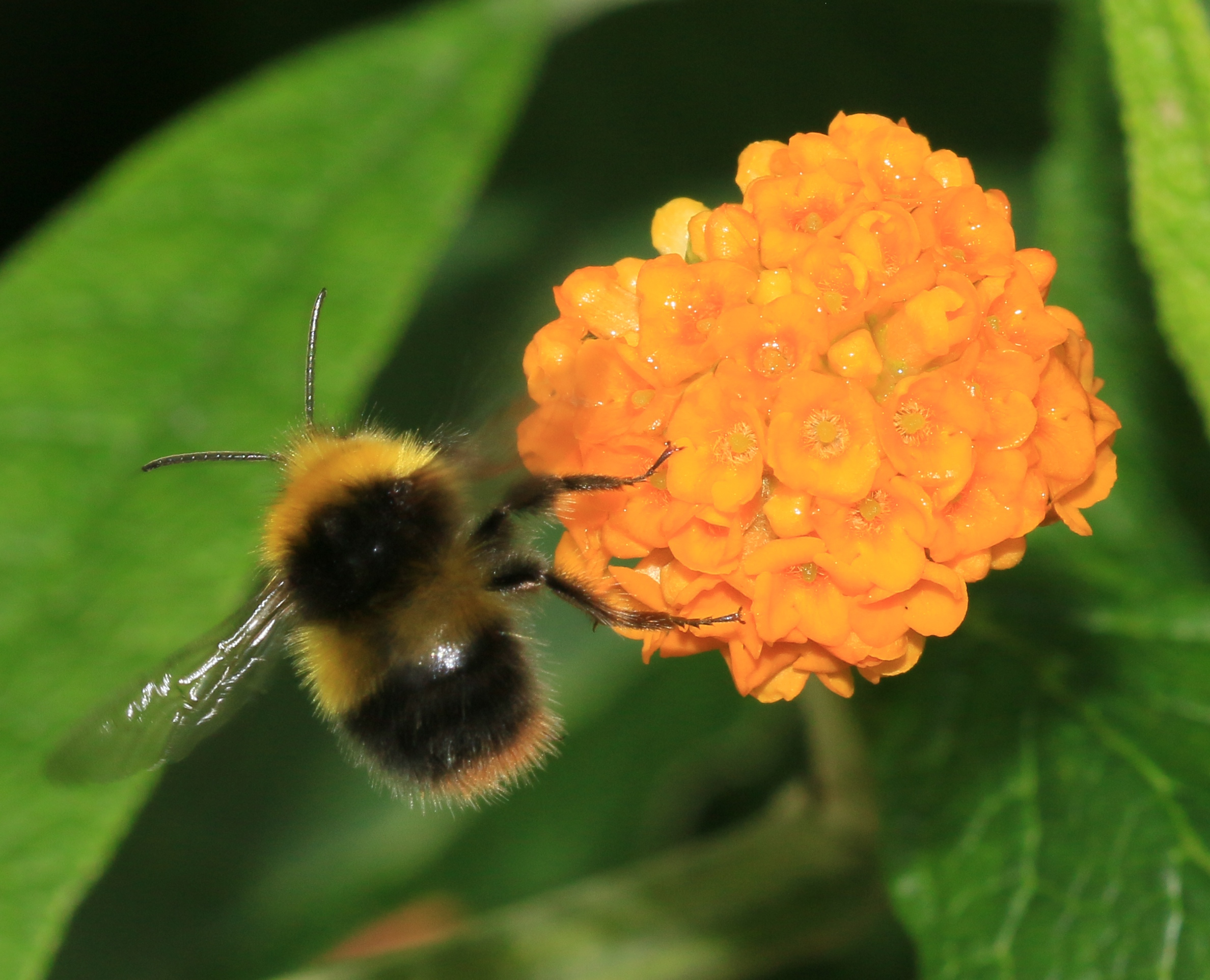
Bombus pratorum pollinating

Pyrobombus collect pollen from a variety of flora by using their hind legs (scopa) to trap pollen between body hairs. By vibrating at high frequencies, pollen can be expelled from the bee's body to transport back to the colony and to other plants for fertilization. This act of buzz pollination is typical of Bombus species.

== Ecology ==
Pyrobombus are commonly found in open environments such as meadows, grass fields, and forests. At these locations, bees can face predators such as bears, birds, badgers, and hornets.

=== Ecology in Europe ===
==== Pyrobombus brodmannicus ====
P. brodmannicus is found in higher altitudes like the French Alps. Although it forages on a variety of plants, P. brodmannicus bees in Caucasia specialise in the Boraginaceae.

== Distribution ==
Pyrobombus bees are widespread in the Northern Hemisphere. Most Pyrobombus species are experiencing habitat loss, with a few endangered in certain locations.

== Species list ==
The subgenus contains the following species:

- Bombus abnormis (Tkalcu, 1968)
- Bombus ardens Smith, 1879 – fire-tailed bumblebee
- Bombus avanus (Skorikov, 1938)
- Bombus beaticola (Tkalcu, 1968)
- Bombus bifarius Cresson, 1878 – two-form bumblebee
- Bombus bimaculatus Cresson, 1863 – two-spotted bumble bee
- Bombus biroi Vogt, 1911
- Bombus brodmannicus Vogt, 1909
- Bombus caliginosus (Frison, 1927) – obscure bumblebee
- Bombus centralis Cresson, 1864 – central bumblebee
- Bombus cingulatus Wahlberg, 1854 – small tree bumblebee
- Bombus cockerelli Franklin, 1913 – Cockerell's bumblebee
- Bombus ephippiatus Say, 1837
- Bombus flavescens Smith, 1852
- Bombus flavifrons Cresson, 1863 – yellow-fronted bumble bee or yellowhead bumblebee
- Bombus frigidus Smith, 1854 – frigid bumblebee
- Bombus haematurus Kriechbaumer, 1870
- Bombus huntii Greene, 1860
- Bombus hypnorum (Linnaeus, 1758) – tree bumblebee or new garden bumblebee
- Bombus impatiens Cresson, 1863 – common eastern bumblebee
- Bombus infirmus (Tkalcu, 1968)
- Bombus infrequens (Tkalcu, 1989)
- Bombus johanseni Sladen, 1919
- Bombus jonellus (Kirby, 1802) – heath humble-bee or small heath bumblebee
- Bombus kotzschi Reinig, 1940 [sic]
- Bombus lapponicus (Fabricius, 1793)
- Bombus lemniscatus Skorikov, 1912
- Bombus lepidus Skorikov, 1912
- Bombus luteipes Richards, 1934
- Bombus melanopygus Nylander, 1848 – black-tailed bumblebee, black tail bumblebee, or orange-rumped bumblebee
- Bombus mirus (Tkalcu, 1968)
- Bombus mixtus Cresson, 1878 – fuzzy-horned bumblebee, tricoloured bumblebee, orange-belted bumblebee, or mixed bumblebee
- Bombus modestus Eversmann, 1852
- Bombus monticola Smith, 1844 – bilberry bumblebee, blaeberry bumblebee or mountain bumblebee
- ?Bombus oceanicus Friese, 1909
- Bombus parthenius Richards, 1934
- Bombus perplexus Cresson, 1863 – confusing bumblebee
- Bombus picipes Richards, 1934
- Bombus pratorum (Linnaeus, 1761) – early bumblebee or early-nesting bumblebee
- Bombus pressus (Frison, 1935)
- Bombus pyrenaeus Pérez, 1880
- Bombus rotundiceps Friese, 1916
- Bombus sandersoni Franklin, 1913 – Sanderson bumblebee
- Bombus sitkensis Nylander, 1848 – Sitka bumblebee
- Bombus sonani (Frison, 1934)
- Bombus subtypicus (Skorikov, 1914)
- Bombus sylvicola Kirby, 1837
- Bombus ternarius Say, 1837 – orange-belted bumblebee or tricolored bumblebee
- Bombus vagans Smith, 1854 – half-black bumblebee
- Bombus vancouverensis Cresson, 1878
- Bombus vandykei (Frison, 1927) – Van Dyke's bumblebee
- Bombus vosnesenskii Radoszkowski, 1862 – yellow-faced bumblebee
- Bombus wangae Williams et al., 2009
- Bombus wilmattae Cockerell, 1912
