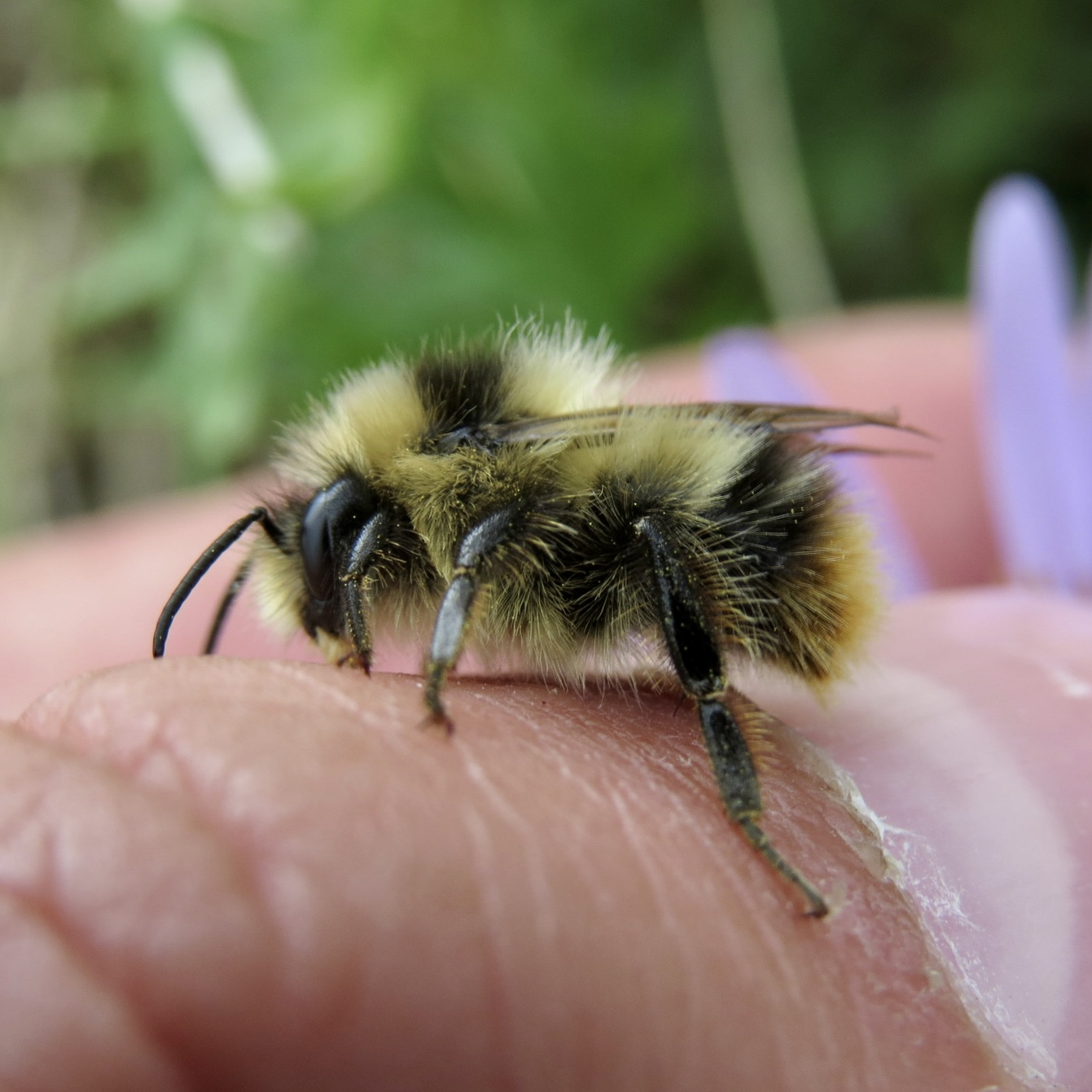
- Stikine Region, B.C., 2023

Conservation status
- Least Concern (IUCN 3.1)

Scientific classification
- Kingdom: Animalia
- Phylum: Arthropoda
- Clade: Pancrustacea
- Class: Insecta
- Order: Hymenoptera
- Family: Apidae
- Genus: Bombus
- Subgenus: Pyrobombus
- Species: B. frigidus

Binomial name
- Bombus frigidus Smith, 1854
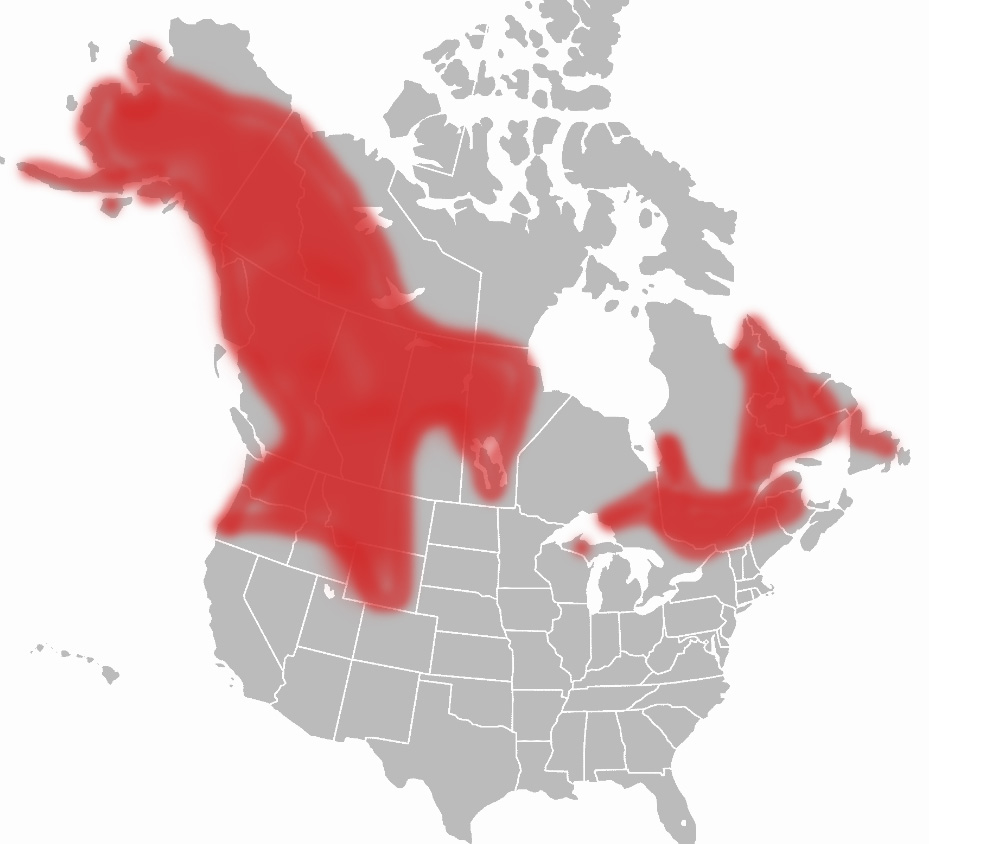

= Bombus frigidus =

Species of bee

Bombus frigidus, the frigid bumblebee, is a rare species of bumblebee largely found in Canada and parts of the United States.

These bees have adapted to their cold environment by being able to keep their internal temperature within a certain range while also being able to expel heat to keep the colony warm. An additional adaptation to the cold is their reduced length of copulation. Also, B. frigidus has developed a relationship with Mertensia paniculata so that the flowers' color signals to the bees when to obtain nectar.

== Taxonomy and phylogeny ==
Bombus frigidus was described in 1854 by Frederick Smith in the Catalogue of hymenopterous insects in the collection of the British Museum. Some species from the Appalachians have been included with this species in the past, but not in newer sources. This bee can be confused with Bombus mixtus and Bombus balteatus. Bees in the family Apidae consist of honey bees, bumblebees, and stingless bees.

== Description ==
Bombus frigidus have a yellow thorax and T1–T2. T1–T5 refers to the dorsal abdomen of the bee with T1 being closer to the thorax-abdomen division. A black band is present between the wings (the band may not be there for some males). The T4–T5 are orange or yellow. The hair of the face is black for females (can be black or yellow for males). The corbicular fringe (pollen sack near the back of the bee) is pale orange. The hair length is long, and the males are roughly half the size of the queen. The hair on the legs for both sexes is black.

== Distribution and habitat ==
Bombus frigidus is a rare bee that is found from Alaska to the eastern shore of Canada, and as far south as Colorado. There have been erroneous reports of the bee being spotted in California, Ohio, Tennessee, North Carolina and Virginia. These arctic bees live in cold, high latitude or altitude areas. Their colonies are formed either in small burrows or on the ground. Despite being rare, their populations are not decreasing like other bumblebees, and they are considered of "Least Concern" in terms of conservation status.

== Behavior ==
=== Colony cycle ===
Like most bumblebees, B. frigidus has a eusocial seasonal colony in which the queen lives for a year. During the winter, the queen will stay in a small chamber in the ground, which she had previously found or dug for herself, called a hibernaculum. As soon as the snow melts around mid May, the queen will begin to search for a nest site. B. frigidus queens tend to leave their hibernacula earlier than other arctic bees. Also, arctic bees have ovaries which develop faster than those of temperate bees. This allows arctic bees to start their colonies faster, which is necessary due to the shorter time between winters in arctic regions. The queens fly close to the ground, often stopping to examine a potential nesting site. While the queen is searching, she will not carry any pollen. Once a suitable site is found, she will begin to collect pollen to make a brood clump and feed the brood. She will also start to build a wax cup, called a honey pot, to store the pollen and nectar. When the nest is ready, she will lay eggs on the brood clump and incubate them with her abdomen. The queen will remain in the nest until she needs more food or until the eggs hatch. The eggs will hatch about four days after being laid, but it takes about four weeks for the first workers to become adults. The colony will continue to grow during the summer, and the queen will continue to produce eggs, rarely leaving the nest. The workers will supply her with nectar, maintain the colony, and help her produce a group of male offspring. New queens are produced shortly thereafter. The reproductive bees will leave the colony to mate around early September. After mating, the males will die and the new queens will obtain nectar for a short time before finding a new hibernaculum for the winter.

=== Mating behavior ===
Bombus frigidus differs from most bumblebees mating behavior in length of copulation time. These bees take approximately ten minutes to copulate, which is significantly shorter than the thirty to eighty minutes of other bees. The male will place a scent on prominent objects and will fly on a route until he finds a mate. The pheromone is produced by a pair of glands in the labial gland. The male will grab onto the females thorax to get into position. The queen will then move her stinger aside if she wants to copulate with him. After the sperm has been transferred, the male will secrete a sticky mixture into the female. When the mixture has hardened, other males won't be able to copulate with the female. This increases the chance that this particular male's genes will be passed on. Once the male has mated, he will die shortly thereafter.

=== Temperature regulation ===
Larger bees are able to better conserve heat at low temperatures than smaller bees. This is because surface area increases at a smaller rate than volume, thus larger bees with more volume are able to conserve metabolically generated heat. B. frigidus bees are one of the larger types of bumblebees, with an estimated dry mass of 0.257 grams and volume of 40.3 mm^{3} for the queens. Worker bees have an estimated mass of 0.130 grams and volume of 27.9 mm^{3}. The average thoracic temperature for both queens and workers is 36.2 degrees C. This allows them to survive at temperatures and altitudes that would kill smaller bees. The larger size does have a drawback: increasing size leads to the need for greater thoracic temperatures to initiate flight. In other words, there is an upper limit to how large the bees should become. If the bee is too large, it won't be able to reach the necessary internal temperature to fly, which would leave it vulnerable to predators and unable to procure nutrition. Therefore, it would die and not pass on its genes, and natural selection would thus prevent these larger bees from being propagated.

Bombus frigidus also seem to be able to transfer heat from the thorax to the abdomen. They can do this in order to keep the colony at a certain temperature. To replace the heat that is transferred from the thorax to the abdomen to be radiated to the colony, the bee can shiver by using the flight muscles in the thorax.

=== Kin recognition and discrimination ===
Bombus frigidus has been observed to preferentially breed with non-nestmates by recognizing naturally borne cues. The exact cues are unknown, but they could be specific ways of flying, a pheromone, or a specific sound. When compared with other bumblebees, B. frigidus spends significantly less time copulating and has fewer copulations overall, while still garnering the same reproductive success as other bumblebees. This saves the bees' time and energy and protects the bees from predators (less time copulating means less time in the open, vulnerable to predators). On the rare occasions when two nestmate bees copulate, the time is shown to be very brief which means that sperm may not have been transferred.

When males and females of a bee species often encounter one another without environmental recognition cues, natural selection is likely to favor a mechanism of naturally borne cues. In addition, sexually active males and females often fail to disperse during the mating season and will thus encounter one another. This failure to disperse makes the recognition of naturally born cues vital for the success of a hive's genes.

This bumblebee is known to be one of at least two species of bumblebees that have a mechanism against inbreeding (the other species being Bombus bifarius). When fertile queens and drones from the same colony meet during the mating period, they tend to avoid each other. In other bees inbreeding is avoided because females and males from the same colony are not so likely to encounter each other. In general, inbreeding is not common in bees.

== Interactions with other species ==
=== Diet ===
Bombus frigidus feed on the nectar of plants with their medium short tongue. For bees on the eastern half of North America, the nectar usually comes from Cirsium (thistles), Epilobium, Geranium, Mertensia (bluebells), Taraxacum officinale (dandelion), and Trifolium (clovers). For bees on the western half, the plants are Epilobium, Lupinus, Geranium, Symphoricarpos, Trifolium, and Achillea. This nectar is brought back to the colony for the larvae to feed on.

=== Parasites ===
Bombus frigidus is predominantly parasitized by mites of the genus Pneumolaelaps including: longanalis, richardsi, and sinahi. The mites are predominantly found on honey pots or in pollen cylinders. When the mites are on the bees themselves, they are found mostly on queen and male bees but not on worker bees. This can be explained by the fact that only the queen bees (and the mites attached to them) have a chance to live until the next spring. Male bees commonly enter the nests of their own and other species, giving the mites the chance to spread to another colony or to another queen.

=== Mutualism ===
At first glance, the relationship between B. frigidus and Mertensia paniculata (bluebells) may look as if the bees simply steal the nectar without helping the flower to pollinate, but this is only half of the story. This particular flower has two stages: young flowers are pink and produce pollen and older flowers are blue and produce nectar. When a bee encounters a pink flower, it will climb into the mouth of open flowers or open closed flowers to get to the pollen. When a bee encounters a blue flower, it will bypass the mouth and go straight for the corolla which contains the nectar. This plant has flowers which bloom sequentially. This means that any particular plant is likely to have both pink and blue flowers. The blue flowers attract bees to that plant where the bees obtain both nectar and pollen. It was found that plants with blue and pink flowers were twice as likely to be visited by a bee when compared to plants with just pink flowers. So the usual mutualistic exchange of food for pollination is still there; it just exists in a different format.

== Conservation ==
The largest threat facing B. frigidus is climate change, as these bees inhabit a specialized climate. As temperature rises, the bees may be driven either farther north or to extinction. With increasing temperatures, snow does not pack as tightly. This leads to earlier melting, and during the summer, water isn't as readily available. This causes the habitat to dry out and fewer plants bloom, thus reducing nectar supply for the bees.

High-elevation cold habitats also tend to have fewer species in them and thus contain less diversity and more straightforward food webs. This means that if B. frigidus feels the effects of climate change, then the other species which interact with the bees will be negatively impacted as well. Ergo, the overall result will be more pronounced.

Less important (but still significant) threats include loss of habitat, use of pesticides, diseases from managed pollinators (diseases which come from human raised insects like honey bees and ant farm ants), and competition with bees that are moving north due to warmer temperatures and lost habitats.

== Agriculture ==
To increase pollination and production of the lowbush blueberry plant in Newfoundland, Canada, non-native bee species have been imported. Since these bees are not from the area and are farm raised, they are infected by diseases and parasites that the native bees don't have a defense against. This has caused a decline in all Bombus species in the area and unfortunately, many of the indigenous plants rely on these native species for pollination. With the decrease in natural pollinators, these plants may end up being replaced by plants that are favored by the imported bees. This change in plant life may in turn decrease the diversity of birds and mammals.
