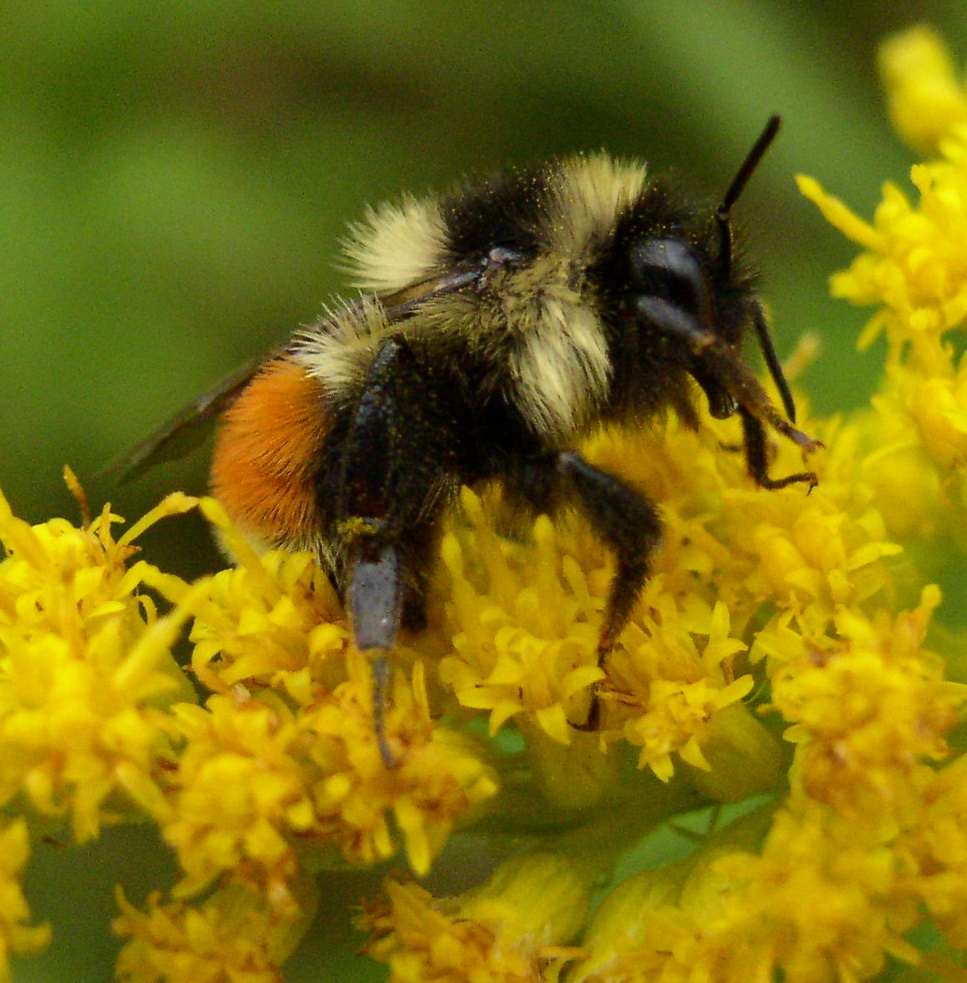

Conservation status
- Least Concern (IUCN 3.1)

Scientific classification
- Kingdom: Animalia
- Phylum: Arthropoda
- Clade: Pancrustacea
- Class: Insecta
- Order: Hymenoptera
- Family: Apidae
- Genus: Bombus
- Subgenus: Pyrobombus
- Species: B. ternarius

Binomial name
- Bombus ternarius Say, 1837

= Bombus ternarius =

Species of insect

Bombus ternarius, commonly known as the orange-belted bumblebee or tricolored bumblebee, is a yellow, orange and black bumblebee. It is a ground-nesting social insect whose colony cycle lasts only one season, common throughout the northeastern United States and much of Canada. The orange-belted bumblebee forages on Rubus, goldenrods, Vaccinium, and milkweeds found throughout the colony's range. Like many other members of the genus, Bombus ternarius exhibits complex social structure with a reproductive queen caste and a multitude of sister workers with labor such as foraging, nursing, and nest maintenance divided among the subordinates.

== Description ==
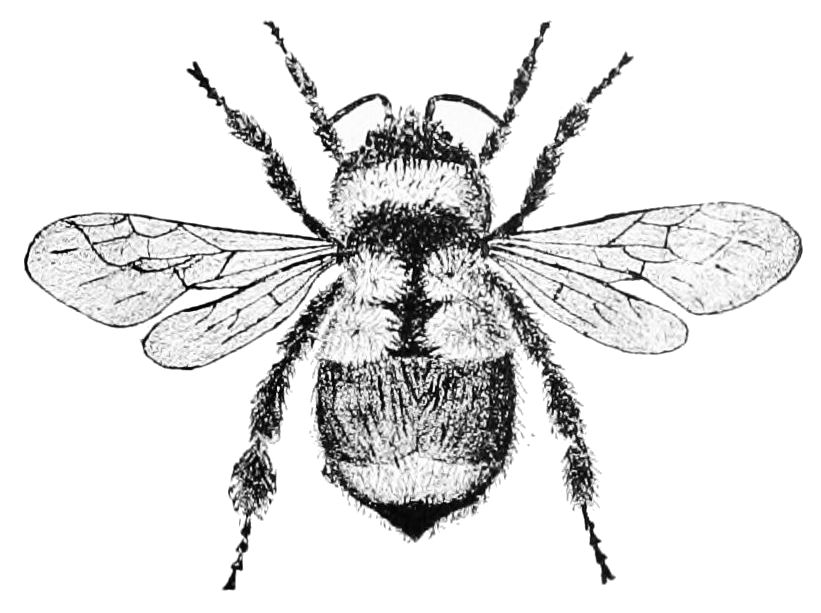
Drawing of a B. ternarius splayed out

B. ternarius is a small, fairly slender bumblebee. The queen is 17–19 mm (0.67–0.75 in) long and the breadth of the abdomen is 8.5–9 mm (0.33–0.35 in). The workers are 8–13 mm (0.31–0.51 in), and the drones are 9.5–13 mm (0.37–0.51 in) in length. Both the worker and the drone have abdomens about 4.5–5.5 mm (0.18–0.22 in) in breadth.

The queen and workers have black heads, with a few pale yellow hairs. The anterior and posterior thorax and the first and fourth abdominal segments are yellow, abdominal segments 2 to 3 are orange, and the terminal segments are black. The queen and the workers are close in resemblance, and the most striking difference between them is in the size of their fat deposits. Workers have very little fat, particularly in their abdomen, leaving plenty of room for the honey stomach, an enlargement of the oesophagus in which nectar can be stored on foraging trips. In contrast, in young queens, the abdomen is largely full of fat. This leads to queens being heavier for their size than workers.

The drone has a yellow head with a few black hairs. The coloration of the thorax and abdomen is similar to that of the females, with the exception that the last abdominal segments are yellow on the sides. The fur of the drone is longer than that of the females.

B. huntii, another species of bumblebee common throughout the western United States, is nearly identical in coloration to B. ternarius, though it has primarily yellow facial hairs rather than black.

== Range ==
B. ternarius mainly ranges in the northern parts of the US and much of Canada. Their range extends from the Yukon to Newfoundland and Labrador and British Columbia. Their United States territory extends from New York and Pennsylvania to Michigan, Washington, Wyoming, Utah and Montana. The bumblebees are most successful in the northern, temperate climate, but they can rarely be found farther south.

B. ternarius, like most members of its genus, are seasonal, meaning the queen comes out of hibernation in late April to start a new colony. The bumblebee workers fly from May to October when the entire colony dies (except hibernating queens) to start the cycle again.

== Lifecycle and nesting ==
In late April, the queen comes out of hibernation from under a few inches of loose soil or leaf litter, and begins to search for a nesting site. Bombus ternarius prefer to nest underground in small and shallow cavities like rodent burrows or natural crevices. She flies low to the ground, stopping often to investigate holes in the earth, and once a satisfactory nest site is found, she forages for pollen and nectar to support her future offspring. Next, the queen secretes a protective waxy coating and builds a grove where she lays fertilized eggs destined to be the first of the new workers. The queen straddles the eggs, allowing for close contact between the ventral surface of her abdomen and thorax and the eggs. This close contact allows the queen to incubate her brood with the heat she generates by pulsing contractions in her abdomen.

These eggs progress through four lifecycle stages starting as an egg, then larva, pupa, and after about a month after laying the egg, the adult workers emerge. Considering that the entire lifecycle of a colony is only about a season long, incubation is necessary because it hastens the development of the first workers. However, the generation of such vast amounts of heat is incredibly costly for the queen. The queen uses an estimated 600 mg of sugar per day to incubate her brood. To obtain this amount of energy, she may need to visit as many as 6,000 flowers. Naturally, during her absence, the brood cools rapidly, so the availability of plentiful and rewarding flowers near the nest site is vital.

The newly hatched workers take over the duty of foraging and expanding the nest. The workers also assist in incubation of the eggs and larvae. B. ternarius nests rarely exceed more than 200 individuals.

In late summer, the queen switches to laying unfertilized eggs, which develop into male drones that are meant for reproduction. Towards the end of her life, the queen reverts to laying fertilized eggs. These eggs give rise to new female queens. The new adult queens forage for food. They use the nest for shelter, but the new queens do not contribute to the nests food reserves. During this time, the new queens mate with roaming male drones, build up reserves of body fat, and fill their nectar crop with honey to survive winter hibernation. The rest of the colony, including the old queen, dies in mid-autumn.

=== Reproduction ===
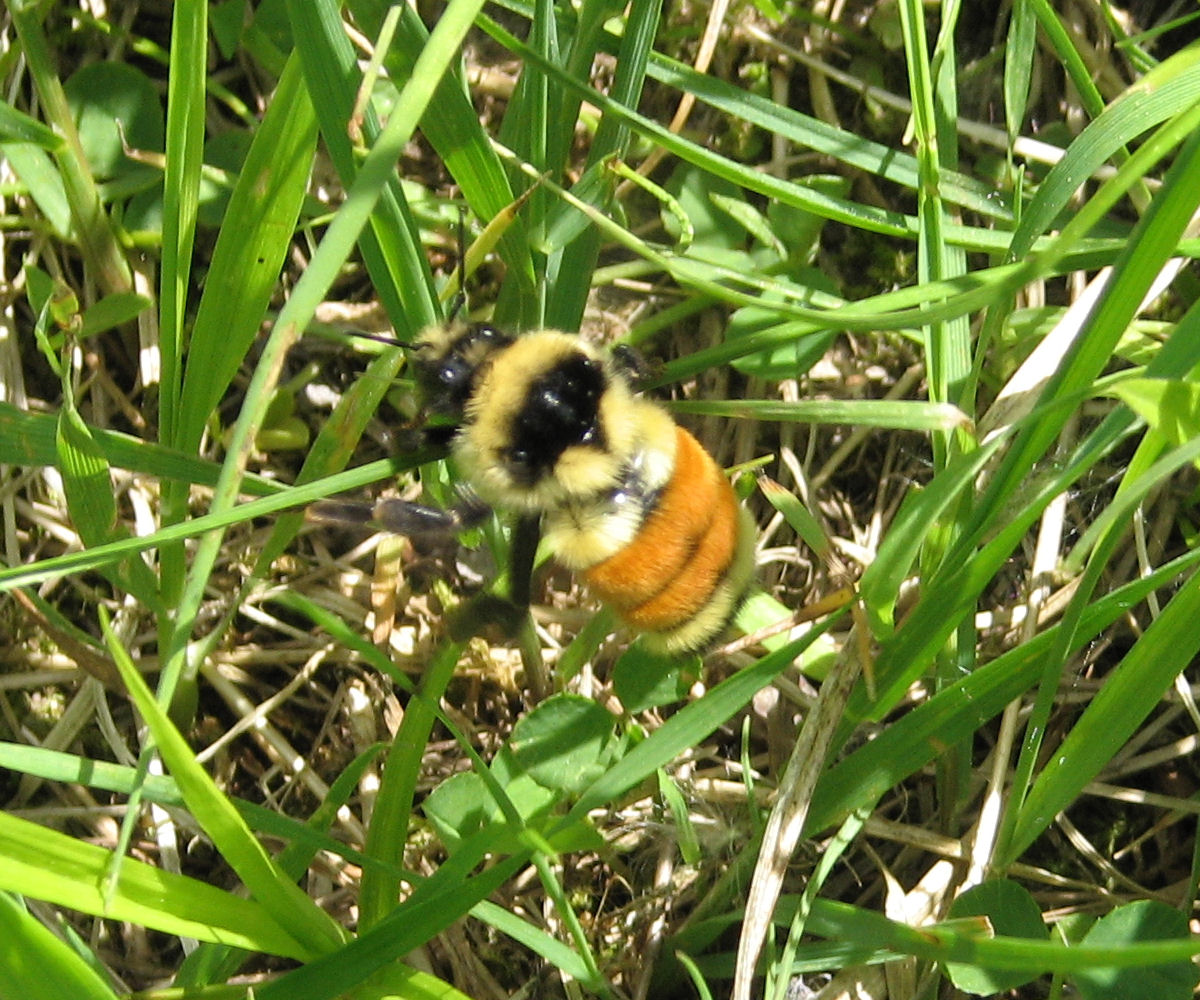
A B. ternarius drone looking for a mate

Drones have one function in life: reproduction. They fly in a circuit and deposit a pheromone on prominent places such as tree trunks, rocks, posts, etc., to attract the newly hatched queens. A new queen follows the pheromone trail and mates with the male.

Mating among B. ternarius typically occurs on the ground or in vegetation. The male mounts the female by grabbing her thorax, the queen then extends her stinger and the male inserts his genital capsule. Mating time varies widely from about 10 to 80 minutes, with the sperm being transferred within the first two minutes of copulation. While mating, both the male and female are vulnerable to predators. After the transfer of sperm is complete, the male secretes a sticky substance that hardens into a plug that blocks new sperm for about three days. This prevents other males from impregnating the same queen and competing to fertilize eggs. The plug helps reduce competition and increases the first male's evolutionary success.

Individual colonies have slightly different reproductive strategies. About half of the queens adopt an early switching strategy that produces mostly male drones, and the other half adopt a late switching strategy, giving rise to mostly new queens. Because of this, bumblebee female to male sex ratio differs from the standard Hymenoptera three to one ratio as proposed by the haplodiploidy hypothesis, and sits closer to an even sex ratio. One hypothesis proposes that the reason why bumblebee's sex ratio differ from the characteristic hymenopteran ratio is because of the queen's decision-making. She can decide to adopt an early switching, male-producing strategy, or a late switching, queen-producing strategy. The worker bees have no choice but to go along with the queen's choice. Normally, the workers would work to shift the ratio towards female prevalence, but in the case of B. ternarius, this would disfavor the workers' evolutionary success.

=== Sex determination ===
For all hymenopterans, sex is determined by the number of chromosomes an individual possesses. Fertilized eggs get two sets of chromosomes, one from each parent, and so larva develop into diploid females, while unfertilized eggs only contain one set from the mother, so develop into haploid males or drones. The act of fertilization is under the voluntary control of the egg-laying queen. This phenomenon is called haplodiploidy.

However, the actual genetic mechanism of haplodiploid sex determination in bumblebees is more complex than simple chromosome number. In bumblebees, sex is actually determined by a single gene locus with many alleles. Haploids at that locus are male and diploids are female, but occasionally a diploid will be homozygous at the sex locus and develop as a male instead. This is especially likely to occur in an individual whose parents were siblings or other close relatives. Diploid males are known to be produced by inbreeding in many ant, bee, and wasp species. Diploid biparental males are usually sterile.

One consequence of haplodiploidy is that females have more genes in common with their sisters than they do with their own daughters. Because of this, cooperation among kindred females may be unusually advantageous, and has been hypothesized to contribute to the multiple origins of eusociality within bumblebees and other hymenopterans. In many colonies of bees, ants, and wasps, worker females remove eggs laid by other workers due to increased relatedness to direct siblings, a phenomenon known as worker policing.

=== Caste determination ===
All fertilized eggs are capable of developing into members of either caste, whether the larva will turn into a worker or a queen, regardless of when they are laid during colony development. Some evidence suggests bumblebees can determine the caste of a larva by feeding it a special diet. Larvae are fed a mixture of pollen and nectar combined with proteins secreted by adult bees. These proteins are mainly invertase and amylase produced in the hypopharyngeal gland. This mixture is regurgitated and presented to the larvae in droplets. Future queens may receive additional glandular secretions, but in terms of total protein, pollen, and carbohydrates in the food mixture, larvae of all castes receive the same proportions. Nurse bees have been observed to feed queen, worker, and male larvae using the contents of the same crop, so it seems unlikely a significant difference exists in the food consumed by larvae of different castes.

By experimentally starving larvae, Pereboom et al. were able to demonstrate larvae produce a cue that stimulates workers to feed them. This suggests the rate at which larvae are fed might at least be partially controlled by the larvae. If feeding had a role in caste determination, this would mean the larvae have a partial say in determining their future caste. Larvae, then, may have to make an economic decision as to whether becoming a worker or a queen is more beneficial.

A more promising explanation of caste determination involves a pheromone excreted by the current queen. The queen excrete a pheromone to which larvae are sensitive between two and five days after emerging from the egg. The presence of the pheromone forces a larva to enter an irreversible pathway towards development as a worker. The absence of this pheromone causes the larva to become a queen. The pheromone has not yet been identified, but the evidence for its existence is convincing. Evidence suggests the pheromone is not airborne, but is transmitted directly by contact from bee to bee and from adults to larvae. Larvae separated from the queen by a fine mesh developed into queens, but if workers were regularly moved from the queen's side to the side the larvae were on, then the larvae developed as workers.

== Nutrition ==
Major plants visited include Rubus, goldenrods, Vaccinium, and milkweeds. B. ternarius eats and collects both nectar and pollen. The nectar is stored in a special internal pouch called the crop, while pollen collects on the hairs on the bumblebee body. The bumblebee pushes the grains of pollen towards its hind legs, where the pollen is pushed into the pollen basket. At the nest, the contents of the nectar crop is regurgitated, where it is mixed with enzymes and allowed to air dry. As the nectar and enzyme mixture dries, honey is created. Pollen is mixed with the nectar and honey to create a protein-rich larval food.

Before the introduction of western honey bees, bumblebees were the only honey-producing bees in North America; however, only small quantities are produced.

== Behavior ==
Queen and worker bumblebees can sting. Unlike honey bee stingers, a bumblebee's stinger lacks harpoon-like barbs on the end of the stinger, so B. ternarius can sting repeatedly without risk of disemboweling itself and dying. B. ternarius is not normally aggressive, but will sting in defense of its nest or when threatened or provoked.

=== Eusociality ===
B. ternarius, as well as other members of the genus Bombus, live in eusocial colonies in which the individuals in the group act as a single multiorganismal superorganism. Eusociality may have evolved in the bumblebee ancestor as a result of offspring remaining in the nest as adults to help rear their mother's young. The evolution of eusociality can be explained by Hamilton's inclusive fitness theory. The mostly sterile workers forage for food and take care of the colony's needs, while the queen is in charge of reproducing and creating new generations of workers. Toward the end of the colony lifecycle, workers jostle the queen, eat her eggs, and attempt to lay eggs of their own. The workers are not completely sterile, despite their inability to mate, since they have ovaries. Worker eggs always develop into males. The queen usually retaliates by acting aggressively toward the workers and trying to eat the workers' eggs. However, the queen's retaliation proves insufficient in some cases and the aggressive reproductive bumblebee workers kill her.

=== Foraging ===
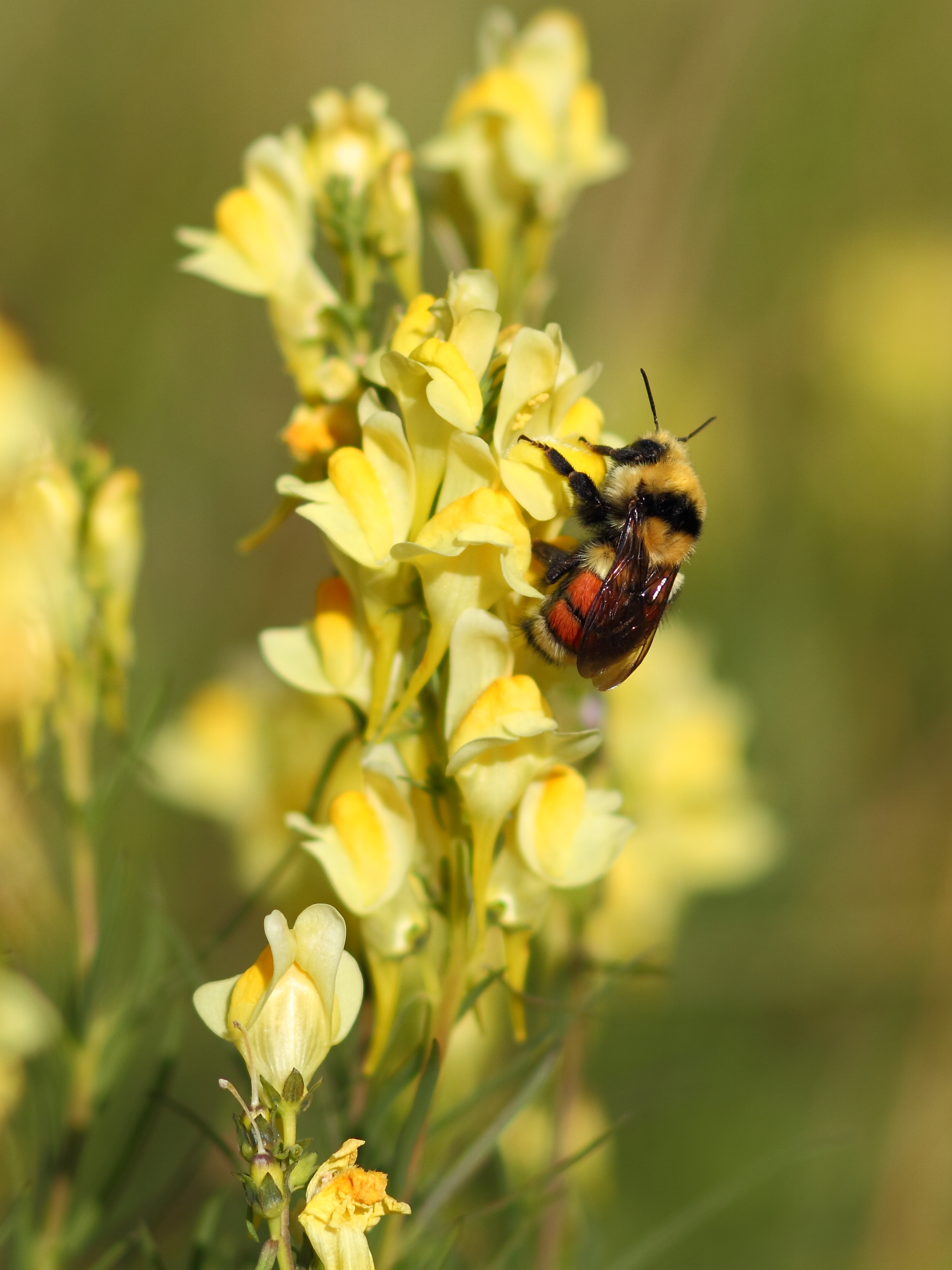
B. ternarius foraging on common toadflax (Linaria vulgaris)

Flight for bumblebees is energy costly. Estimates put bumblebee metabolic rate at extremes surpassing even hummingbird metabolic rates, so efficient foraging and good decision-making is paramount or the workers risk a net loss of energy. Pollen is rich in protein necessary to sustain flight, but is more difficult to collect than nectar. Bumblebees exhibit individual learning. New pollen foragers tend to return lighter from about the first 10 foraging trips, allowing foraging efficiency to increase, until it plateaus at about 30 trips. Furthermore, bumblebees tend to collect pollen when conditions are dry and humidity is lower, presumably because pollen clumps are drier then, making foraging easier. For this reason, more experienced and older workers tend to collect pollen. This approach means inexperienced foragers waste less energy and more pollen is returned to the nest, maximizing the colonies' evolutionary success.

Little is known about its precise foraging range, but bumblebees' range is, on average, up to 6 km (3.7 mi) which can be extended to far away as 20 km (12 mi) when resources are scarce. One would predict that food patches nearest to the nest would be most visited, so would offer the least uncollected nectar and pollen. A trade-off occurs between energy expenditure in flight and the competition between workers. This effect pushes workers to explore further away from the nest to forage. Some propose that bumblebees venture out farther past their nest because foraging near the nest could bring unwanted attention from predators and consequently risk the success of the colony. This predator hypothesis, however, is often dismissed as showing little effect on bumblebee foraging range.

A bumblebees often does not fill its nectar crop to full capacity when foraging. This phenomenon is best explained by the marginal value theorem. The weight of nectar in the nectar crop adds an additional energetic cost to flight, so a heavily loaded bumblebee expends significantly more energy to the point of diminishing returns. Depending on the flight distance, a fully filled crop may cause a bumblebee to burn more energy than a partially filled crop would bring back.

=== Division of labor ===
The queen's primary role is to reproduce and ensure the colony has a steady supply of new workers. The worker bumblebees are responsible for most of the other chores, such as foraging, nest maintenance, and tending to the larvae. Younger workers typically start life as a worker where most of their time is devoted to working in the nest. Wax in bumblebees is secreted from the underside of the abdomen of the worker. An individual bumblebee's ability to produce wax starts at about the second day of adult life, but starts to decline after the first week. Since wax is only required within the nest, young workers are predisposed towards within-nest work such as nest maintenance. As bumblebees mature, they are more likely to switch over from within-nest duty to foraging. Furthermore, newer foragers generally collect nectar and tend to switch over to collecting pollen as they age. Long ago, foragers of a range of different bumblebee species were noticed to tend to be larger, on average, than bees that performed within-nest work. This trend can best be explained by the observation that larger-sized workers tend to switch from within-nest work to foraging earlier than smaller workers. The very smallest workers never switch to foraging and remain within-nest workers their entire lives.

== Name ==
Bombus ternarius was first named by Thomas Say in 1837. Bombus is Latin for buzzing, and refers to the sound the insects make. The specific name ternarius refers to the number three, which refers to the bumblebees' three colors.

== See also ==
- List of bumblebee species
