= Bombus cockerelli =

Conservation status
- Critically Imperiled (NatureServe)

Scientific classification
- Domain: Eukaryota
- Kingdom: Animalia
- Phylum: Arthropoda
- Class: Insecta
- Order: Hymenoptera
- Family: Apidae
- Genus: Bombus
- Subgenus: Pyrobombus
- Species: B. cockerelli

Binomial name
- Bombus cockerelli Franklin, 1913

Species of bee

Bombus cockerelli, Cockerell's bumblebee, is a yellow and black bumblebee known only from fewer than 30 specimens, collected at a few high-altitude (over 6,500 ft or 2,000 m) localities in the White Mountains of New Mexico, all within an area of less than 300 square miles (780 km^{2}), giving it the smallest range of any of the ~250 species of bumblebees in the world.

== Description ==
Bombus cockerelli is a typical bumblebee in appearance, with queens 15–20 mm (0.6–0.8 in) long, and distinctly smaller workers. The queens and workers are black on the head, with a few pale yellow hairs. The anterior and posterior thorax and the two basal and two terminal abdominal segments are yellow, while abdominal segments 3 and 4 are black. Males are unknown.

Another species of bumblebee, Bombus balteatus, known to occur at high altitudes in Colorado, is similar to B. cockerelli, but B. cockerelli has a shorter head, numerous intermixed black hairs on the anterior thorax, and the abdominal apex is yellow rather than rust-tinted.

== History ==
The bee was first described in 1913, based on six specimens collected near the Rio Ruidoso in New Mexico. Between 1956 and 2011, not even one was seen. For a time, this bee was believed to be just a subspecies and not a full species. However, given access to fresh specimens whose genetic material can be analyzed, it is expected that it will now be possible to determine whether it is a true species.

== Conservation status ==
Despite how rarely it has been seen, the bee is not believed to be endangered or threatened, because its entire range is in U.S. National Forest and tribal lands.

== Biology ==
Nothing is known regarding the biology of this species, other than some specimens having been collected on thistle flowers.
