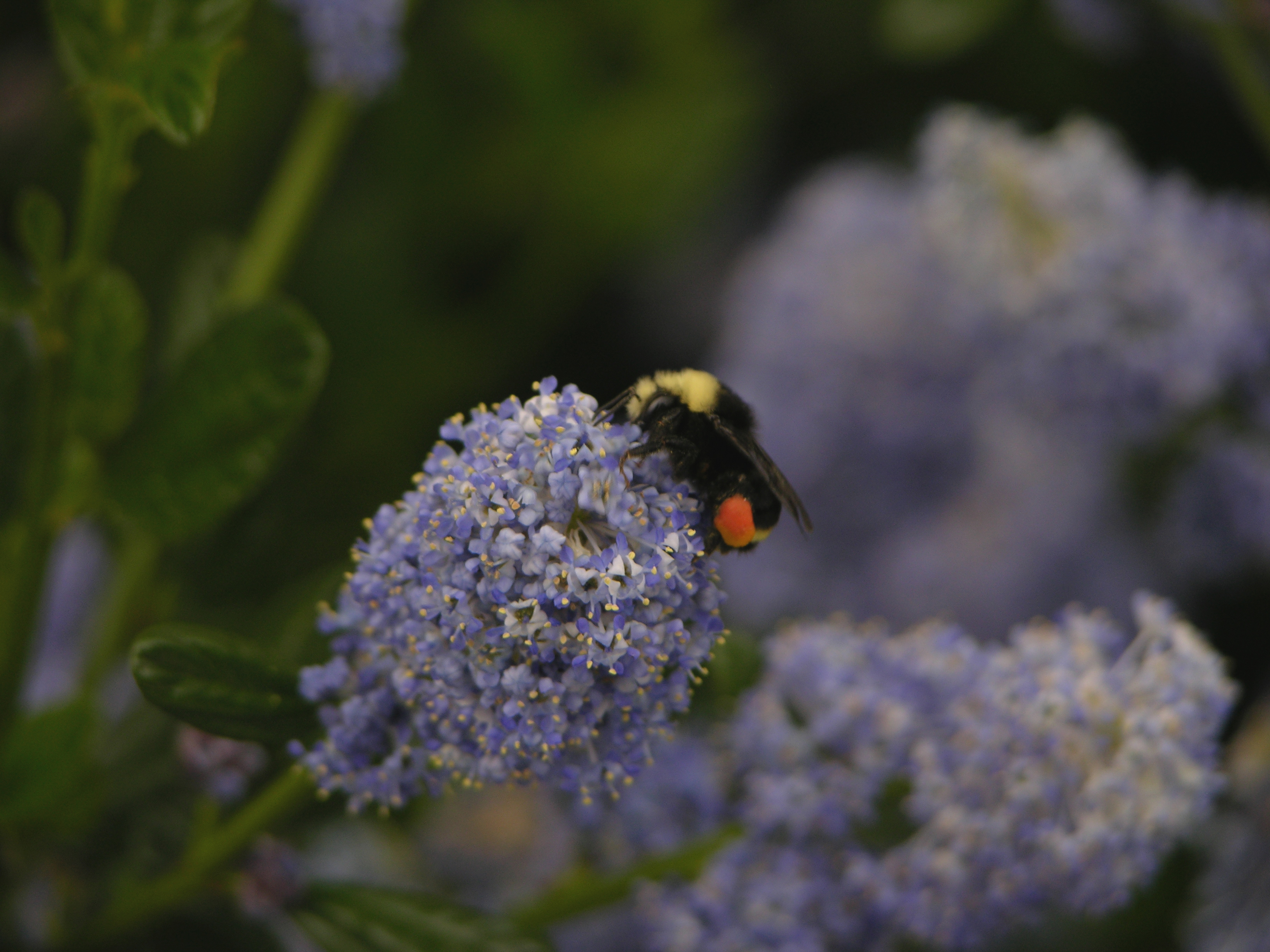

Conservation status
- Vulnerable (IUCN 3.1)

Scientific classification
- Kingdom: Animalia
- Phylum: Arthropoda
- Class: Insecta
- Order: Hymenoptera
- Family: Apidae
- Genus: Bombus
- Subgenus: Pyrobombus
- Species: B. caliginosus

Binomial name
- Bombus caliginosus Frison, 1927

= Bombus caliginosus =

Species of bee

Bombus caliginosus, the obscure bumblebee, is a species of bumblebee native to the West Coast of the United States, where its distribution extends from Washington through Oregon to Southern California.

== Description ==
The obscure bumblebee is very similar to the yellow-faced bumblebee (B. vosnesenskii), and the two can only be definitively told apart by the structure of the male genitalia. The obscure bumblebee tends to have longer hairs, however, and yellow hairs are found on the underside of the abdomen, where B. vosnesenskii has only black hairs on the underside.

== Ecology ==
This bumblebee has been noted on 19 families of plants. The workers are most often seen on Fabaceae, the legume family, while queens are most often seen on Ericaceae, the heath family, and males have been noted most often on Asteraceae, the aster family. Common plants visited by the workers in a sample included ceanothus, thistles, sweet peas, lupines, rhododendrons, Rubus, willows, and clovers. Queens emerge from hibernation in late January, the first workers appear in early March, and the males follow by the end of April. The colony dissolves in late October, when all the inhabitants die except the new queens.
