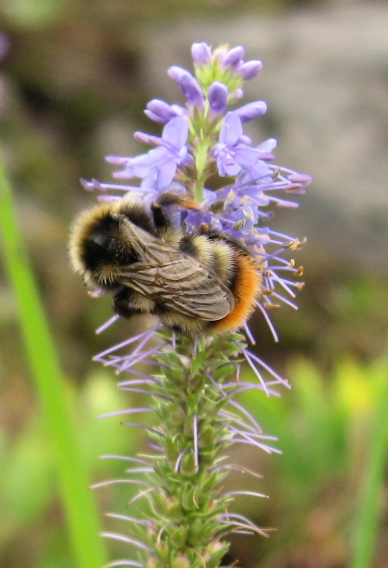

Conservation status
- Least Concern (IUCN 3.1)

Scientific classification
- Kingdom: Animalia
- Phylum: Arthropoda
- Class: Insecta
- Order: Hymenoptera
- Family: Apidae
- Genus: Bombus
- Subgenus: Pyrobombus
- Species: B. lapponicus

Binomial name
- Bombus lapponicus (Fabricius, 1793)

Synonyms
- Bombus zhaosu

= Bombus lapponicus =

Species of bee

Bombus lapponicus is a species of bumblebee. It is native to northern Europe, where it occurs in Finland, Norway, Sweden, and Russia.

This is generally a common bee. The species' exact range is unclear because many collections are actually other bumblebee taxa.

This species lives in taiga and tundra. It feeds on a variety of plant taxa.
