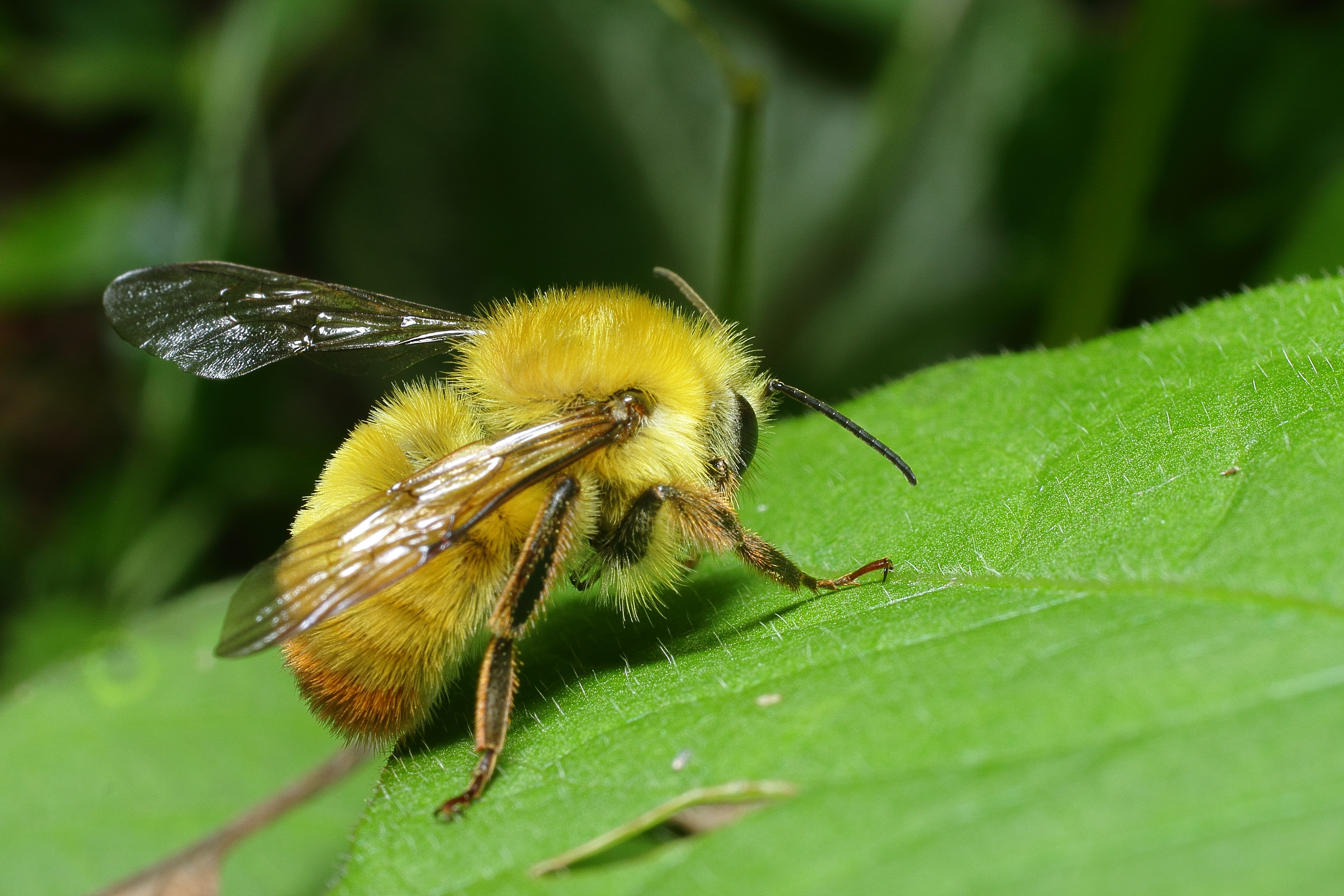

Scientific classification
- Kingdom: Animalia
- Phylum: Arthropoda
- Class: Insecta
- Order: Hymenoptera
- Family: Apidae
- Genus: Bombus
- Subgenus: Pyrobombus
- Species: B. ardens

Binomial name
- Bombus ardens Smith, 1879

= Bombus ardens =

Species of bee

Bombus ardens, also known as the fire-tailed bumblebee, is a species of bumblebee found in Japan and Korea. It was described in 1879 by Frederick Smith in Descriptions of new species of Hymenoptera in the collection of the British museum.

== Taxonomy ==
Bombus ardens contains the following subspecies:

- Bombus ardens sakagamii
- Bombus ardens ardens
