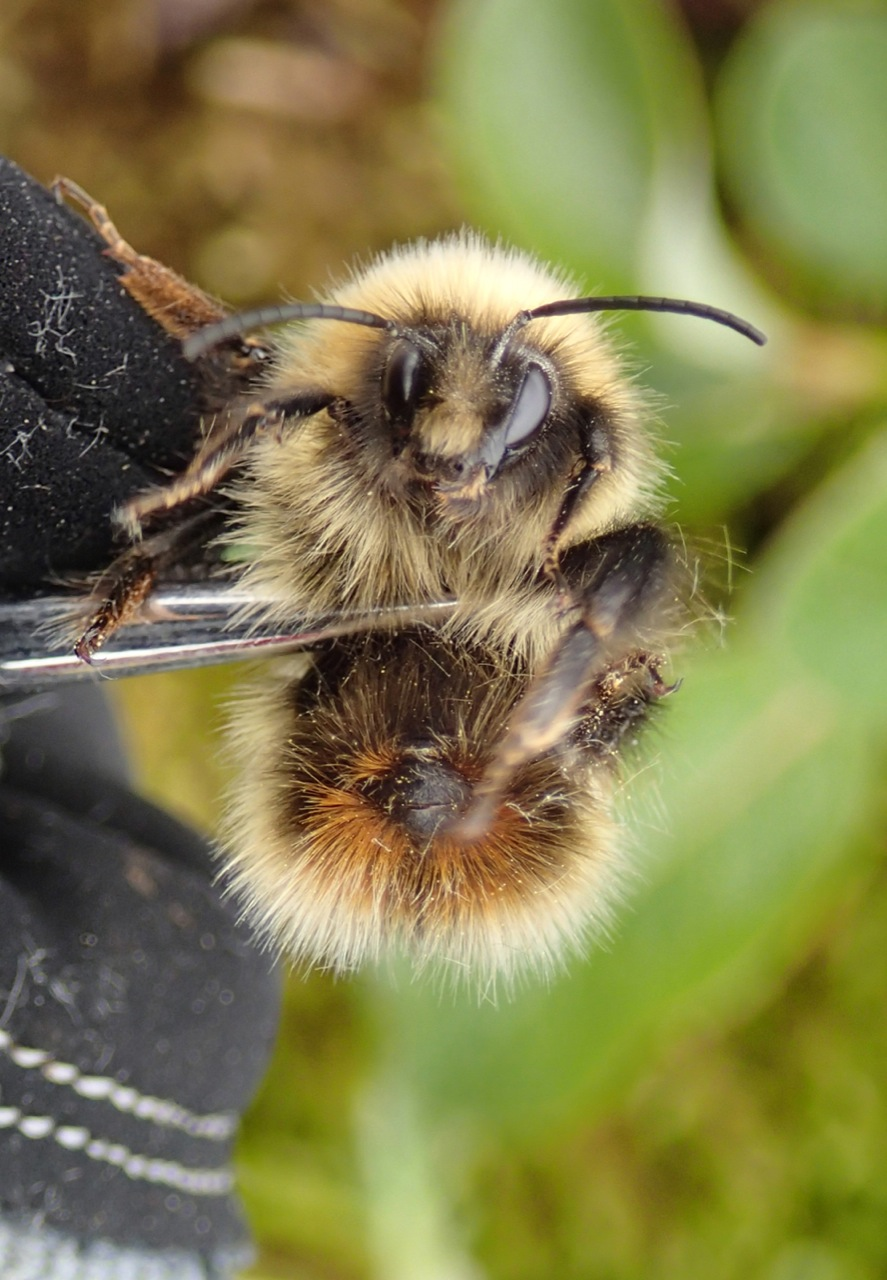

Conservation status
- Data Deficient (IUCN 3.1)

Scientific classification
- Domain: Eukaryota
- Kingdom: Animalia
- Phylum: Arthropoda
- Class: Insecta
- Order: Hymenoptera
- Family: Apidae
- Genus: Bombus
- Subgenus: Alpinobombus
- Species: B. balteatus

Binomial name
- Bombus balteatus Dahlbom, 1832

= Bombus balteatus =

Species of bee

Bombus balteatus, the golden-belted bumble bee, is a species of bumblebee with a boreal and high altitude distribution in northern Eurasia and North America.

== Range and distribution ==
This species is found in Finland, northern Sweden, Norway, Russia, and North America from arctic Alaska, Canada, and mountain ranges in the United States such as the Sierra Nevada and the White Mountains down south to New Mexico. Their preferred habitat includes high altitude and boreal regions, and they are often found at higher elevations than the tree line. Bombus balteatus is often most abundant where Castilleja, Chrysothammnus, and Mertensia plant species are common. Some populations of bees, including in the Rocky Mountains, specifically Mount Blue Sky, Niwot Ridge and Pennsylvania Mountain have declined in the 21st century.

== Morphology ==
Bombus balteatus is a long-tongued bumblebee. Often the tongue length reaches two-thirds or more the length of the body. This morphological feature allows them to specialize on flowers with long corollas. In North America, workers can be identified by a distinctive black abdomen pattern and robust body.

== Systematics ==
The most closely related species are Bombus hyperboreus, Bombus frigidus, and Bombus mixtus, which all occur in Western North America and Arctic Europe.

== Effects of climate change ==
In the Rocky Mountains, USA, many native plants species include flowers with elongated corollas. With abundant resources, B. balteatus can be a dominant species in the ecosystem. However, Rocky Mountain bumblebees, including B. balteatus and Bombus sylvicola, have shown changes in abundance and foraging range as long-tubed floral resources are declining at higher altitudes; they have also exhibited a trend towards shorter tongues over the last 40 years. This is indicative of niche expansion; although this species of bumblebee is considered highly specialized, it is now adapting to forage on a broader range of morphologically diverse flowering plants. Immigration by short-tongued bumble bees into higher altitudes, as well as an increase in the number of Bombus balteatus individuals with shorter tongues, has also occurred as a result of warming and climate change. This creates new competition for long-tongued B. balteatus for limited floral resources.
