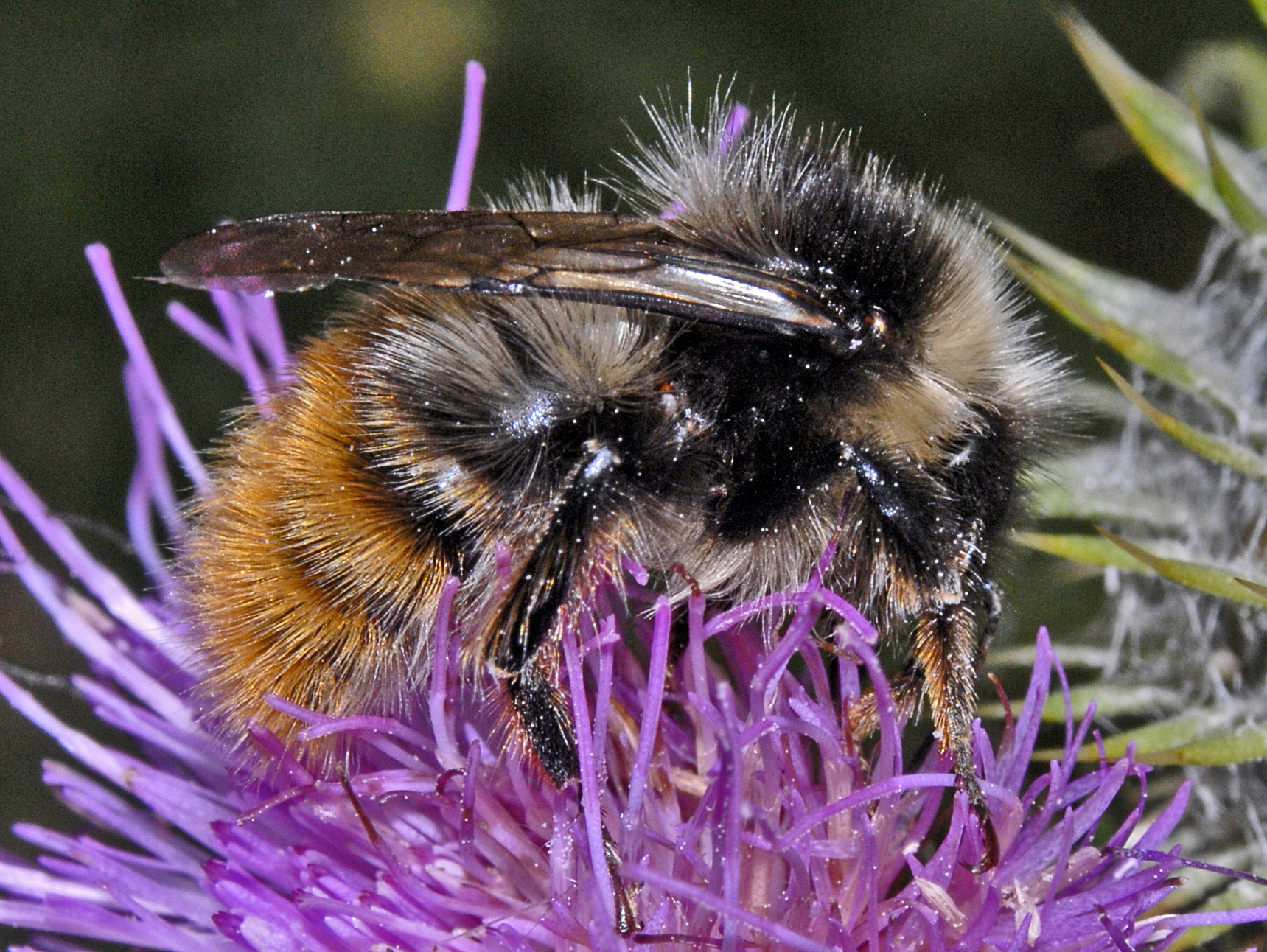
- ssp. tenuifasciatus (female)

Conservation status
- Least Concern (IUCN 3.1)

Scientific classification
- Domain: Eukaryota
- Kingdom: Animalia
- Phylum: Arthropoda
- Class: Insecta
- Order: Hymenoptera
- Family: Apidae
- Genus: Bombus
- Subgenus: Pyrobombus
- Species: B. pyrenaeus

Binomial name
- Bombus pyrenaeus Pérez, 1879

= Bombus pyrenaeus =

Species of bee

Bombus pyrenaeus is a species of bumblebee. It is native to Europe, where it occurs in Andorra, Austria, Bulgaria, France, Germany, Greece, Italy, Montenegro, North Macedonia, Poland, Romania, Serbia, Slovakia, Slovenia, Spain, Switzerland, and Ukraine. Its German-language common name is Pyrenäenhummel. It is a common species, becoming abundant in some areas.

== Description ==
Bombus pyrenaeus can reach a length of 18–20 millimetres (0.71–0.79 in), with a wingspan of 26–30 millimetres (1.0–1.2 in). It has a wide yellow-gray transverse band on the collar, a grayish-yellow transverse band on the scutellum and a third gray yellow transverse fascia between the 1st and 2nd tergites.

There are several different subspecies separated among mountain ranges:

- B. p. afasciatus – Tatra Mountains
- B. p. balcanicus – Carpathians and Balkans
- B. p. pyrenaeus – Pyrenees
- B. p. tenuifasciatus – Alps

== Biology ==
This is a species of alpine climates in high mountain ranges. It feeds on many kinds of plants, but it favors Crocus vernus, thistles, and bilberries.
