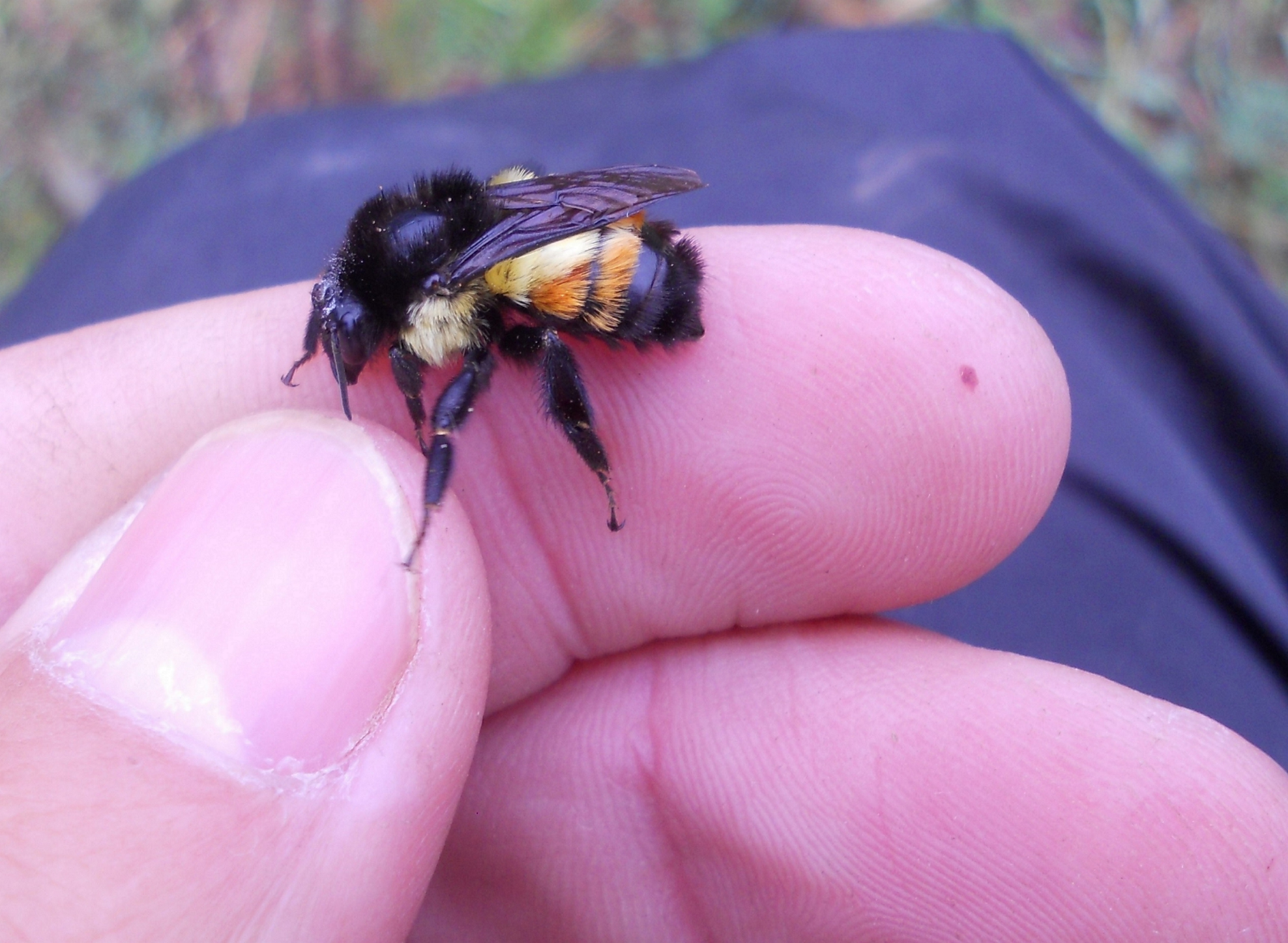

Conservation status
- Least Concern (IUCN 3.1)

Scientific classification
- Domain: Eukaryota
- Kingdom: Animalia
- Phylum: Arthropoda
- Class: Insecta
- Order: Hymenoptera
- Family: Apidae
- Genus: Bombus
- Subgenus: Pyrobombus
- Species: B. ephippiatus

Binomial name
- Bombus ephippiatus Say, 1837

Synonyms
- Bombus folsomi Frison, 1923; Bombus formosus Smith, 1854; Bombus lateralis Smith, 1879; Bombus pulcher Cresson, 1863; Bombus schneideri Friese, 1903; Bombus vauflavus Cockerell, 1949

= Bombus ephippiatus =

Species of bee

Bombus ephippiatus is a species of bumblebee native to Mexico and Central America.

This is a variable species. There are a number of color polymorphisms, with body hairs in shades of white, yellow, orange, red, brown, and black. Its species boundaries are not entirely clear. Some forms are similar to Bombus wilmattae, which may actually be the same species. There may also be some similar specimens in the area that are an as yet undescribed species.

This bee feeds on many kinds of flowers. It is active year-round in some areas. It generally occupies pine-oak forest and other kinds of mountain forest habitat. Its restriction to high-elevation regions may have produced physical isolation that led to its many color polymorphisms.

It is an efficient pollinator of tomato plants. The overcollection of queens from the wild for use in agricultural operations is a potential threat to the species.
