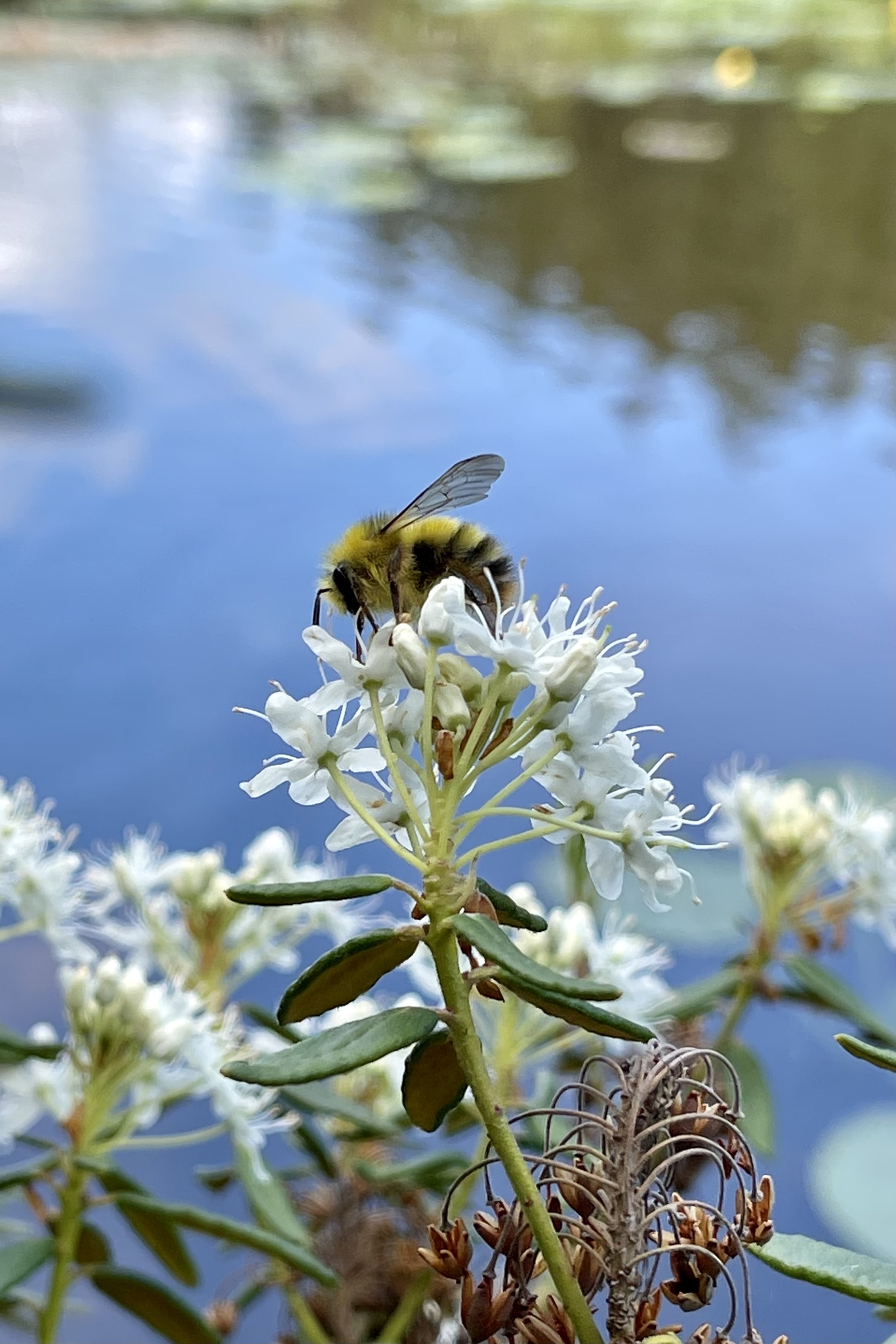

Conservation status
- Least Concern (IUCN 3.1)

Scientific classification
- Kingdom: Animalia
- Phylum: Arthropoda
- Class: Insecta
- Order: Hymenoptera
- Family: Apidae
- Genus: Bombus
- Subgenus: Pyrobombus
- Species: B. sitkensis

Binomial name
- Bombus sitkensis Nylander, 1848

= Bombus sitkensis =

Species of bee

Bombus sitkensis, the Sitka bumblebee, is a species of bumblebee common in western North America from Alaska to California.

== Description ==
The Sitka bumblebee has an oblong head with a medium-length proboscis. The females (queens and workers) have black and yellow hairs intermixed on the face and forward part of the thorax and a black patch in the middle of the thorax, while their sides are yellowish. Terga (abdominal segments) 1 and 2 are yellow, and 3 and 4 black, the latter with a yellow posterior rim. The two last terga are brownish-red. The male has the face and forward parts of the thorax yellow, and only the posterior parts are darker (black and yellow intermixed). On the abdomen terga 1 and 2 are yellow, and terga 3 to 5 yellow on the anterior part, black on the posterior. The tail (terga 6 to 7) is brownish-red.

== Distribution ==
The species is a common bumblebee found in the western North America from Alaska and British Columbia, and Washington, to northern Idaho, western Montana, and the coastal parts of California. The Sitka bumblebee has experienced mild population declines in parks in California due to competition with the yellow-faced bumblebee (B. vosnesenskii) for nesting sites, such as rodent holes.

== Ecology ==
The Sitka bumblebee forages on flowering plants from several families, including the Ericaceae, Asteraceae, Saxifragaceae, and Rhamnaceae. The flight period for the queen is very long, from the end of January to the beginning of December. The first workers emerge in early March, while males appear in early April. Both the latter castes have disappeared by the end of September.

== See also ==
- List of bumblebee species
