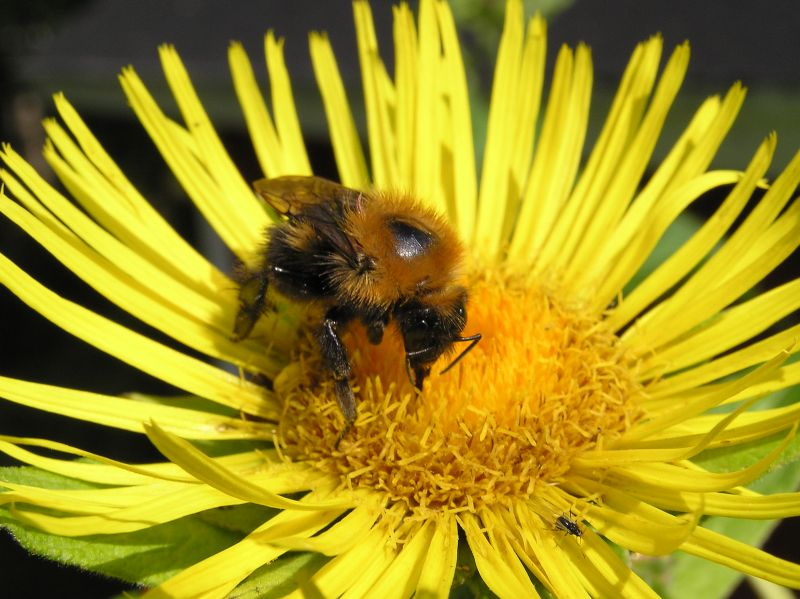

Scientific classification
- Domain: Eukaryota
- Kingdom: Animalia
- Phylum: Arthropoda
- Class: Insecta
- Order: Hymenoptera
- Family: Apidae
- Genus: Bombus
- Subgenus: Pyrobombus
- Species: B. cingulatus

Binomial name
- Bombus cingulatus Wahlberg, 1854

= Bombus cingulatus =

Species of bee

Bombus cingulatus, the small tree bumblebee, is a species of bumblebee found in Eurasia. Its appearance is similar to the tree bumblebee Bombus hypnorum, but it is somewhat smaller, and generally establishes smaller nests. The small tree bumblebee can also be separated from the tree bumblebee by having darker hair forming a small band between the wing knots, which the tree bumblebee lacks.
