= Frederick Sladen =

British and Canadian bee-keeper and entomologist

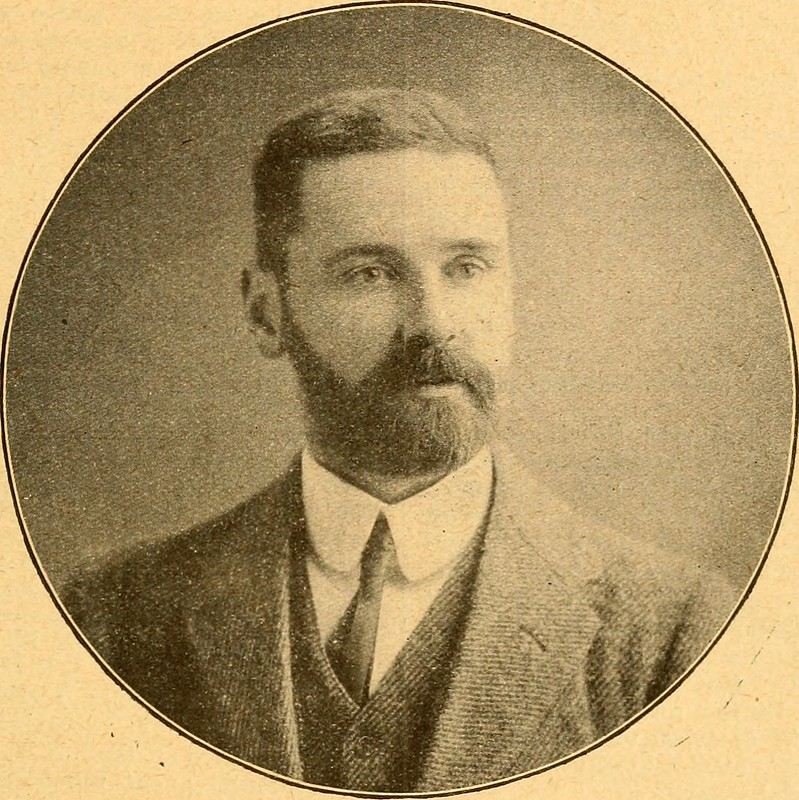

Frederick William Lambart Sladen (30 May 1876 – 10 September 1921) was a British and Canadian bee-keeper and entomologist. After commercially producing hybrid honeybee queens for beekeepers, he moved to Canada where he worked as Dominion Apiarist in Ottawa and published several books on bee-keeping including pioneering studies on the domestication and management of bumblebees.

== Life and work ==
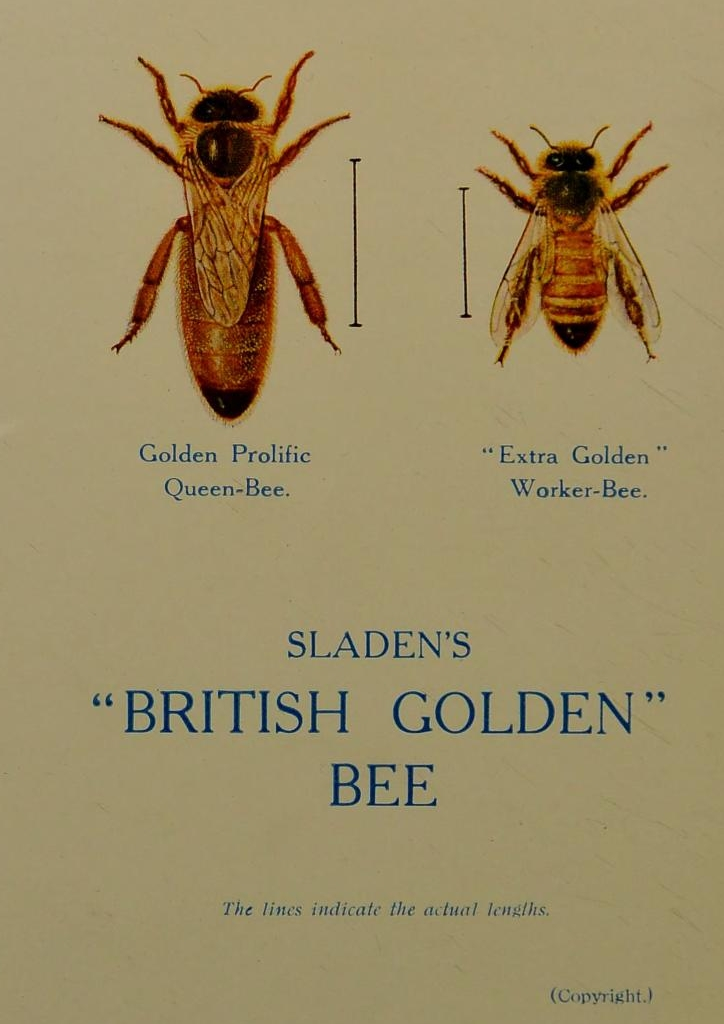
Hybrid queen bees bred by Sladen

Sladen was born in Shooter's Hill, Blackheath, to Lieut.-Colonel Joseph Sladen of the Royal Artillery (1840–1930) and his second wife Lady Sarah Sophia Lambart, daughter of Frederick Lambart, 8th Earl of Cavan. He was tutored at home and began to keep bees from the age of thirteen. He also began to correspond with the editor of the British Beekeeper's Association. He wrote a book on "The Humble Bee" in 1892 at the age of sixteen which received good reviews. He visited India in 1896–7 to examine the honey bees and noted that Apis dorsata and Apis florea were not suitable for domestication and brought a queen of a Himalayan honey bee which he did not find usable. He then began to breed Italian-English hybrid bees for sale and still later other breeds. He moved to build his own house in Ripple, Dover where he conducted experiments and studies on bees. He developed methods to induce bumble-bees to take up homes in artificial observation nests that he placed underground and was able to make novel observations on the behavior of bumble-bees. In 1901 he found the function of Nasanoff's organ in emitting an odour cue used for locating the hive. In 1912, he wrote "The Humbe Bee: its history and how to domesticate it". He also wrote on wild bee species. He received a position as assistant entomologist in the Department of Agriculture in Ottawa, Canada. He was then given the position of Dominion Apiarist. He took an interest in other wasps and bees in Canada. He worked on bee-breeding on Duck Island in Lake Ontario and on September 10, he died from cardiac arrest while bathing on the shore leading to drowning.

Sladen married Violet, daughter of Captain C. R. Barton of Pettigo in 1902. They had two sons and a daughter.
