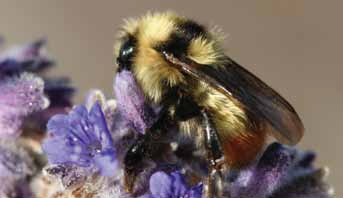
- Queen

Conservation status
- Least Concern (IUCN 3.1)

Scientific classification
- Kingdom: Animalia
- Phylum: Arthropoda
- Class: Insecta
- Order: Hymenoptera
- Family: Apidae
- Genus: Bombus
- Subgenus: Pyrobombus
- Species: B. centralis

Binomial name
- Bombus centralis Cresson, 1864

= Bombus centralis =

Species of bee

Bombus centralis, the central bumblebee, is a species of bumble bee found in parts of Canada and the western United States. The species was first described by Ezra Townsend Cresson in 1864.

== Description ==
Bombus centralis is a small bumblebee with a long face and proboscis and light brown wings. The queen has a body length between 12.5 and 16 mm (0.49 and 0.63 in) and a wing span of 29 to 33 mm (1.1 to 1.3 in); the males have a length of 10 to 13 mm (0.39 to 0.51 in) and a wing span of 22 to 29 mm (0.87 to 1.14 in), while the workers are 9.5 to 12.5 mm (0.37 to 0.49 in) in length with a wing span of 23 to 28 mm (0.91 to 1.10 in). The colouration of the thorax and anterior part of the abdomen is yellow, while terga (abdominal segments) 3 and 4 (for the females) and 3 to 5 (males) are orange-red. The tail is black; overall the hair is long. Across the thorax is a black, medially located band.

== Distribution ==
The species is distributed from British Columbia and Alberta in Canada to California, Arizona and New Mexico in the United States.

== Ecology ==
The bumblebee lives in prairies or river valleys. The hibernating queens appear in late May and start building a nest, often in disused rodent nests. About a month later, the first workers emerge. The nest declines in September, and all the bees, except the new queens, die. The bees forage on various plant taxa, such as wild onions, rabbitbrush, thistles, goldenbushes, coyote mints, penstemons, and phacelias.
