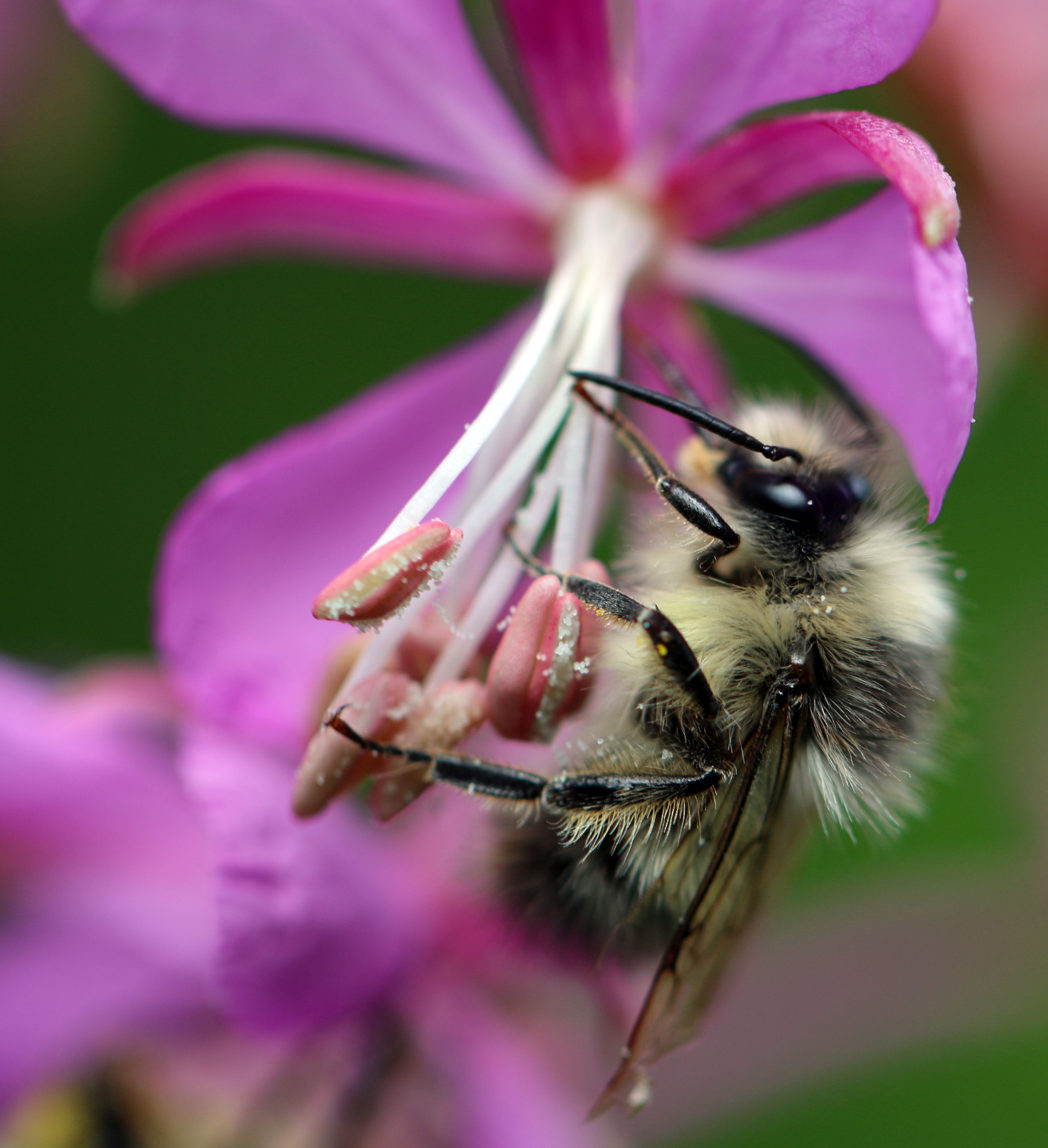

Conservation status
- Least Concern (IUCN 3.1)

Scientific classification
- Kingdom: Animalia
- Phylum: Arthropoda
- Clade: Pancrustacea
- Class: Insecta
- Order: Hymenoptera
- Family: Apidae
- Genus: Bombus
- Subgenus: Pyrobombus
- Species: B. mixtus

Binomial name
- Bombus mixtus Cresson, 1878

= Bombus mixtus =

Species of bee

on globe thistle (Echinops sp.) in Seattle

Bombus mixtus is a species of bumblebee. It is native to western North America, where it occurs in western Canada and the United States. It is also disjunct in the Great Lakes region. It is known commonly as the fuzzy-horned bumblebee, tricoloured bumblebee, orange-belted bumblebee, and mixed bumblebee.

This bee lives in mountain habitat, and taiga and tundra habitat in northern areas. It lives in open, grassy habitat, chaparral, shrublands, and meadows. It feeds at the flowers of ceanothus, fireweed, coyote mints, penstemons, phacelias, rhododendrons, and groundsels. It nests underground or on the surface.
