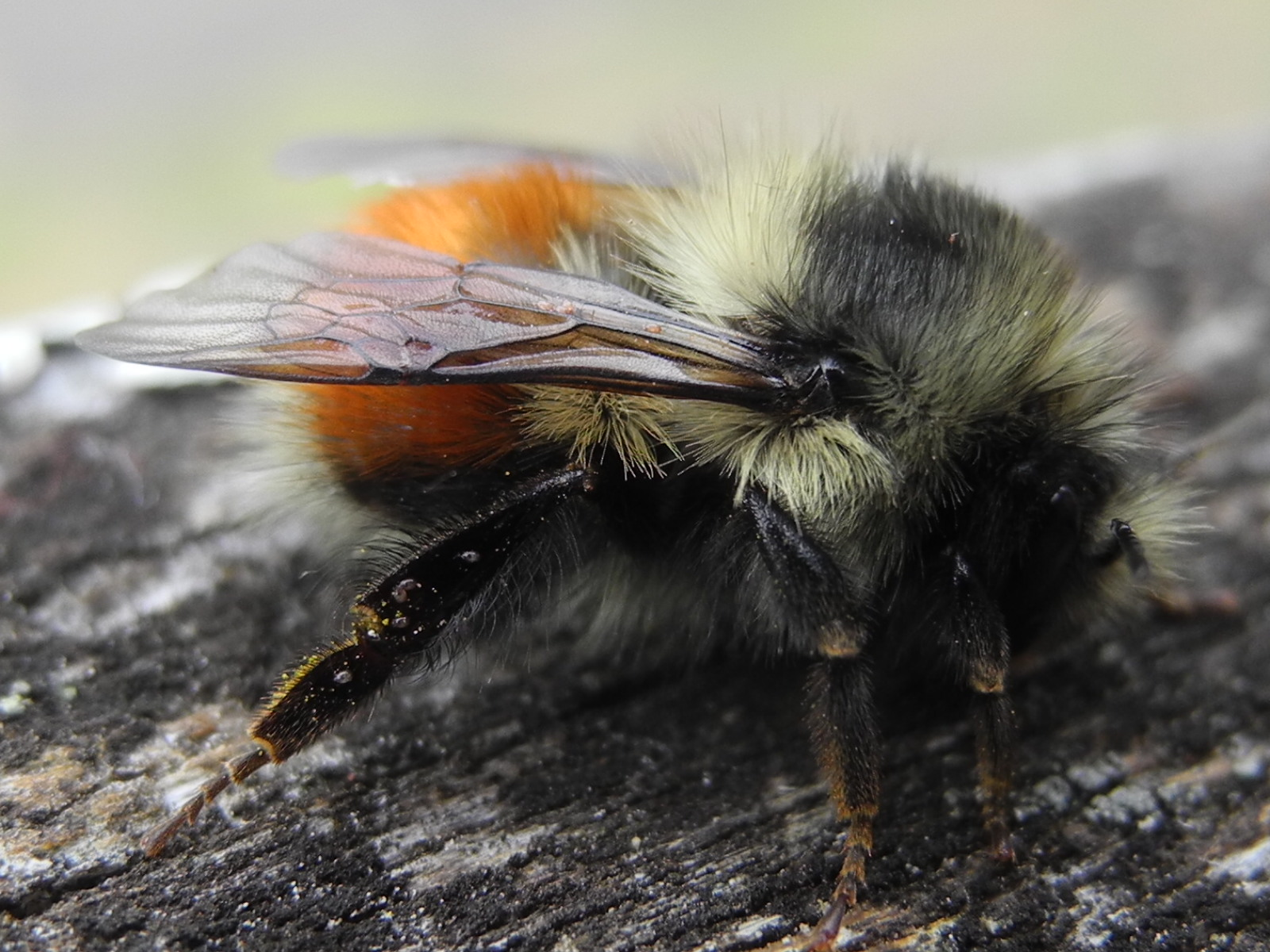
- a vibrant black-tailed bumble bee

Conservation status
- Least Concern (IUCN 3.1)

Scientific classification
- Kingdom: Animalia
- Phylum: Arthropoda
- Clade: Pancrustacea
- Class: Insecta
- Order: Hymenoptera
- Family: Apidae
- Genus: Bombus
- Species: B. melanopygus

Binomial name
- Bombus melanopygus Nylander, 1848

Synonyms
- Bombus edwardsii

= Bombus melanopygus =

Species of bee

Bombus melanopygus, the black-tailed bumble bee, black tail bumble bee or orange-rumped bumblebee, is a species of bumblebee native to western North America.

This bee is widely distributed across western North America, from the Pacific to the Rocky Mountains, and from Alaska to Baja California.

There are two forms of the black-tailed bumblebee:

- Red form (“red butts,” Bombus melanopygus melanopygus) found primarily in higher latitudes of Oregon and points north, and in the Mountain West
- Dark color form (Bombus melanopygus edwardsii) is most common in California and southern Oregon

(The second and third abdominal segments are red in northern populations and black in southern; individuals with black segments were previously known as Bombus edwardsii, a separate species. Genetic analyses support the conclusion that the two forms are the same species, with B. edwardsii as a synonym.)

This bumblebee can utilize a number of habitat types, including agricultural and urban areas. It is "one of the few bumblebees still found regularly in San Francisco". It feeds on many types of plants, including manzanitas, Ceanothus, goldenbushes, wild buckwheats, lupines, penstemons, rhododendrons, willows, sages, and clovers. It nests underground or aboveground in structures.

This species is a host to the zombie fly (Apocephalus borealis).
