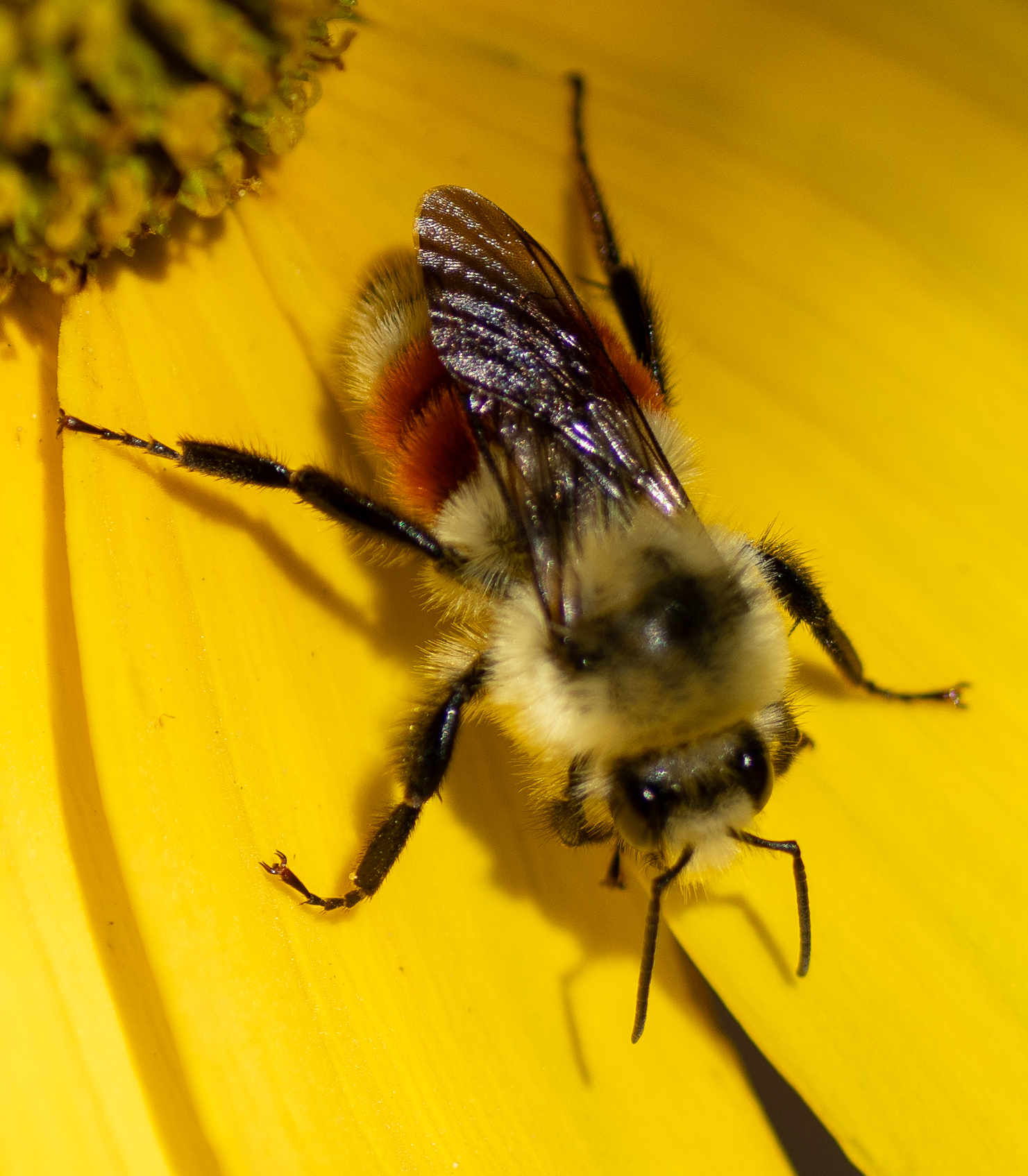
- Sandy, Utah, 2023

Conservation status
- Least Concern (IUCN 3.1)

Scientific classification
- Kingdom: Animalia
- Phylum: Arthropoda
- Clade: Pancrustacea
- Class: Insecta
- Order: Hymenoptera
- Family: Apidae
- Genus: Bombus
- Subgenus: Pyrobombus
- Species: B. huntii

Binomial name
- Bombus huntii Greene, 1860

= Bombus huntii =

Species of bee

Bombus huntii is a species of bumblebee. It is native to western North America, where it occurs in western Canada and the United States as far east as Ontario and Minnesota, and in Mexico as far south as the Trans-Mexican Volcanic Belt. It is known commonly as the Hunt bumblebee or Hunt's bumblebee. This bee's whole genome has been recently sequenced as part of the Beenome100 project.

This bee lives in desert scrub, prairies, and meadows. In the southern part of its range in Mexico it lives in pine ecosystems and it can be found at high elevations, such as the tops of tall volcanoes. The bee is active in summer and fall, and in Mexico it flies throughout much of the year. It nests underground in colonies consisting of a queen, workers, males, and new queens. Colonies only last one-year, with only mated queens overwintering.

Food plants visited by this species include rabbitbrush, thistles, sunflowers, penstemons, phacelias, currants, rudbeckias, and clovers.

This species has experienced declines, but it is still one of the more common bees of western North America.

This bumblebee is susceptible to certain viruses that infect honey bees, such as Black Queen Cell Virus (BQCV) and Deformed Wing Virus (DWV).

Experiments suggest that this and other native species make efficient pollinators of crop plants such as tomatoes, and that commercial rearing would be a viable alternative to introducing non-native bees for the purpose.
