= Fauna of Scotland =

Animals living in Scotland

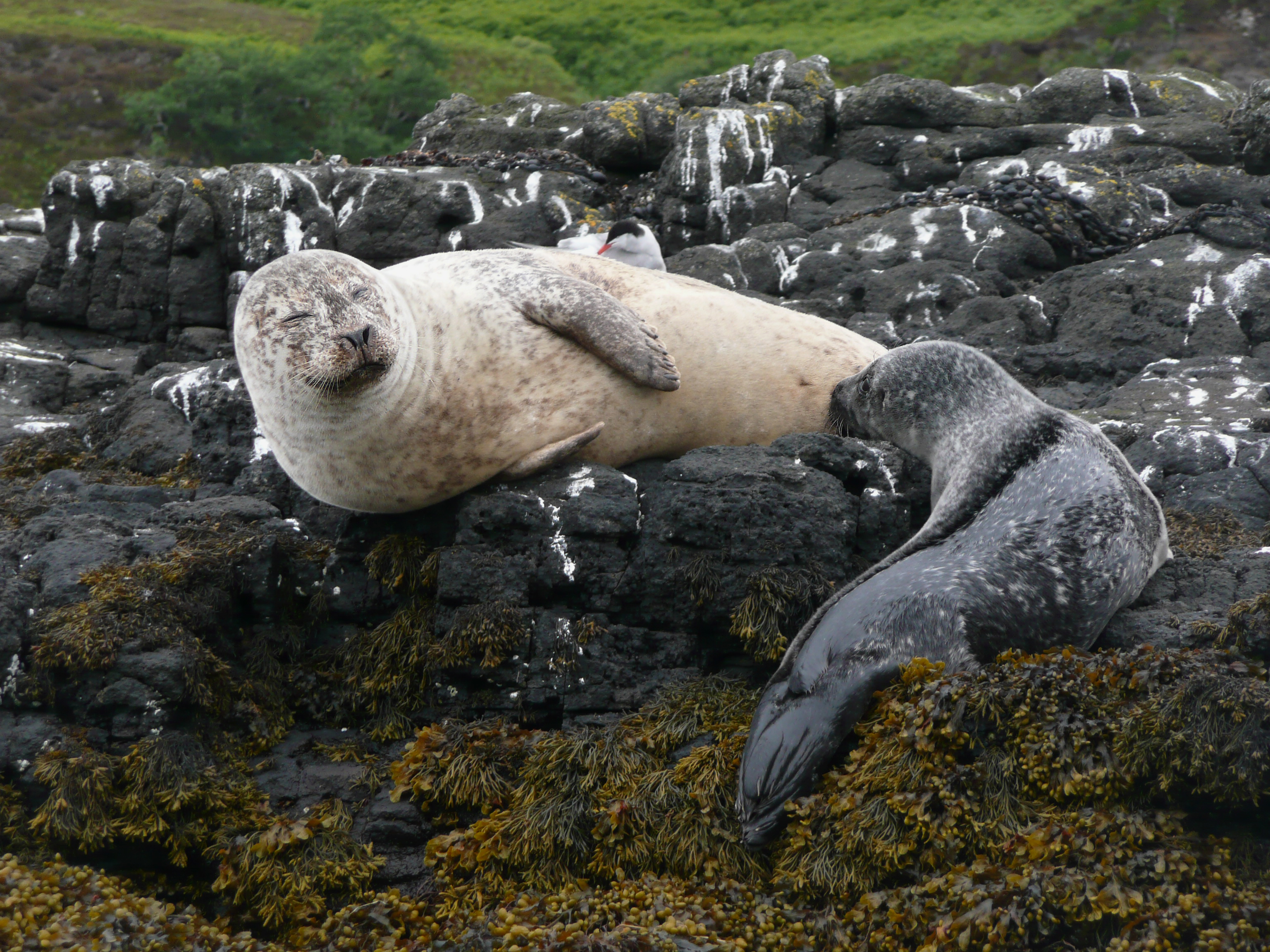
A harbour seal (Phoca vitulina) feeding a pup, island of Skye.

The fauna of Scotland is generally typical of the northwest European part of the Palearctic realm, although several of the country's larger mammals were hunted to extinction in historic times and human activity has also led to various species of wildlife being introduced. Scotland's diverse temperate environments support 62 species of wild mammals, including a population of wildcats, important numbers of grey and harbour seals and the most northerly colony of bottlenose dolphins in the world.

Many populations of moorland birds, including the black and red grouse, live here, and the country has internationally significant nesting grounds for seabirds such as the northern gannet. The golden eagle has become a national icon, and white-tailed eagles and ospreys have recently re-colonised the land. The Scottish crossbill is the only endemic vertebrate species in the UK.

Scotland's seas are among the most biologically productive in the world; it is estimated that the total number of Scottish marine species exceeds 40,000. The Darwin Mounds are an important area of deep sea cold water coral reefs discovered in 1998. Inland, nearly 400 genetically distinct populations of Atlantic salmon live in Scottish rivers. Of the 42 species of fish found in the country's fresh waters, half have arrived by natural colonisation and half by human introduction.

Only six amphibians and four land reptiles are native to Scotland, but many species of invertebrates live there that are otherwise rare in the United Kingdom (UK). An estimated 14,000 species of insect, including rare bees and butterflies protected by conservation action plans, inhabit Scotland. Conservation agencies in the UK are concerned that climate change, especially its potential effects on mountain plateaus and marine life, threaten much of the fauna of Scotland.

== Habitats ==
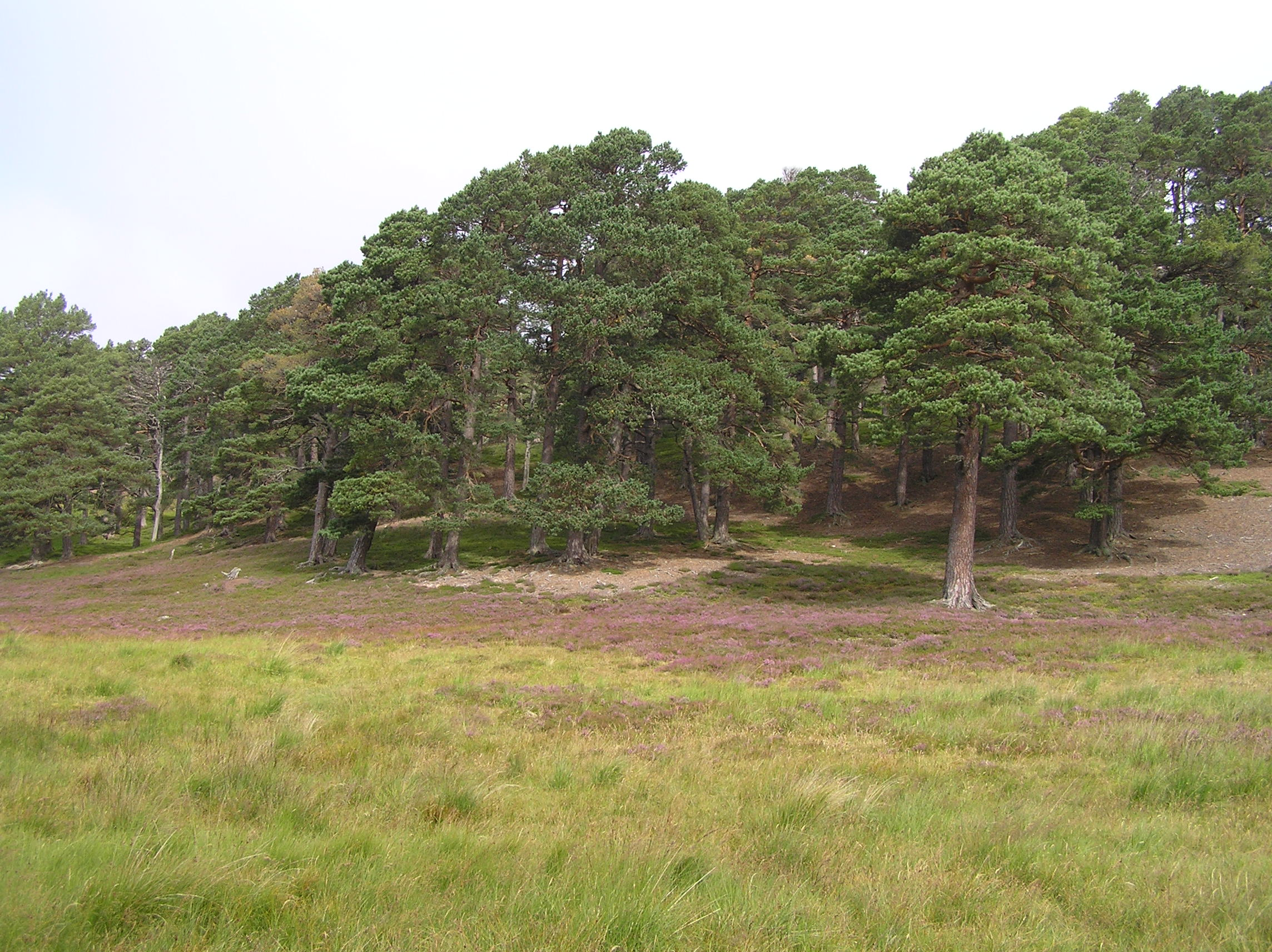
Scots pine forest, Deeside

Scotland enjoys diverse temperate environments, incorporating deciduous and coniferous woodlands, and moorland, montane, estuarine, freshwater, oceanic, and tundra landscapes. About 19% of Scotland is wooded, much of it in forestry plantations, but before humans cleared the land it supported much larger boreal Caledonian and broad-leaved forests. Although much reduced, significant remnants of the native Scots pine woodlands can be found. Heather moorland and peatland cover 17% of Scotland. Caithness and Sutherland have one of the world's largest and most intact areas of blanket bog, which supports a distinctive wildlife community. About 75% of Scotland's land is classed as agricultural (including some moorland) while urban areas account for around 3%. The coastline is 11,803 kilometres (7,334 mi) long, and the number of islands with terrestrial vegetation is nearly 800, about 600 of them lying off the west coast. Scotland has more than 90% of the volume and 70% of the total surface area of fresh water in the United Kingdom. There are more than 30,000 freshwater lochs and 6,600 river systems.

Under the auspices of the European Union's Habitats Directive, 243 sites in Scotland are currently listed as Special Areas of Conservation (SACs), and 162 as Special Protection Areas (SPAs). Scotland's seas are among the most biologically productive in the world and contain 40,000 or more species. Twenty-four of the SACs are marine sites, and a further nine are coastal with marine and non-marine elements. These marine elements extend to an area of around 350 square kilometres (140 mi^{2}). The Darwin Mounds, covering about 100 square kilometres (39 mi^{2}), are being considered as the first offshore SAC.

== Mammals ==
Scotland was entirely covered in ice during the Pleistocene glaciations. As the post-glacial weather warmed and the ice retreated, mammals migrated through the landscape. However, the opening of the English Channel (as sea levels rose) prevented further migrations, so mainland Britain has only two-thirds of the species that reached Scandinavia. The Hebridean islands off Scotland's west coast have only half those of Britain. Sixty-two species of mammal live wild in and around Scotland including 13 species found in coastal waters. The populations of a third of the land mammal species are thought to be in decline due to factors including environmental pollution, habitat fragmentation, changes in agricultural practices, particularly overgrazing, and competition from introduced species. No mammal species are unique to Scotland, although the St. Kilda field mouse, Apodemus sylvaticus hirtensis, is an endemic subspecies of the wood mouse that reaches twice the size of its mainland cousins, and the Orkney vole or cuttick, Microtus arvalis orcadensis found only in the Orkney archipelago, is a sub-species of the common vole. It may have been introduced by early settlers about 4,000 years ago. There are various notable domesticated Scottish mammal breeds including Highland Cattle, the Shetland Pony, Eriskay Pony, Soay Sheep and Scottish Terrier.

=== Carnivores ===
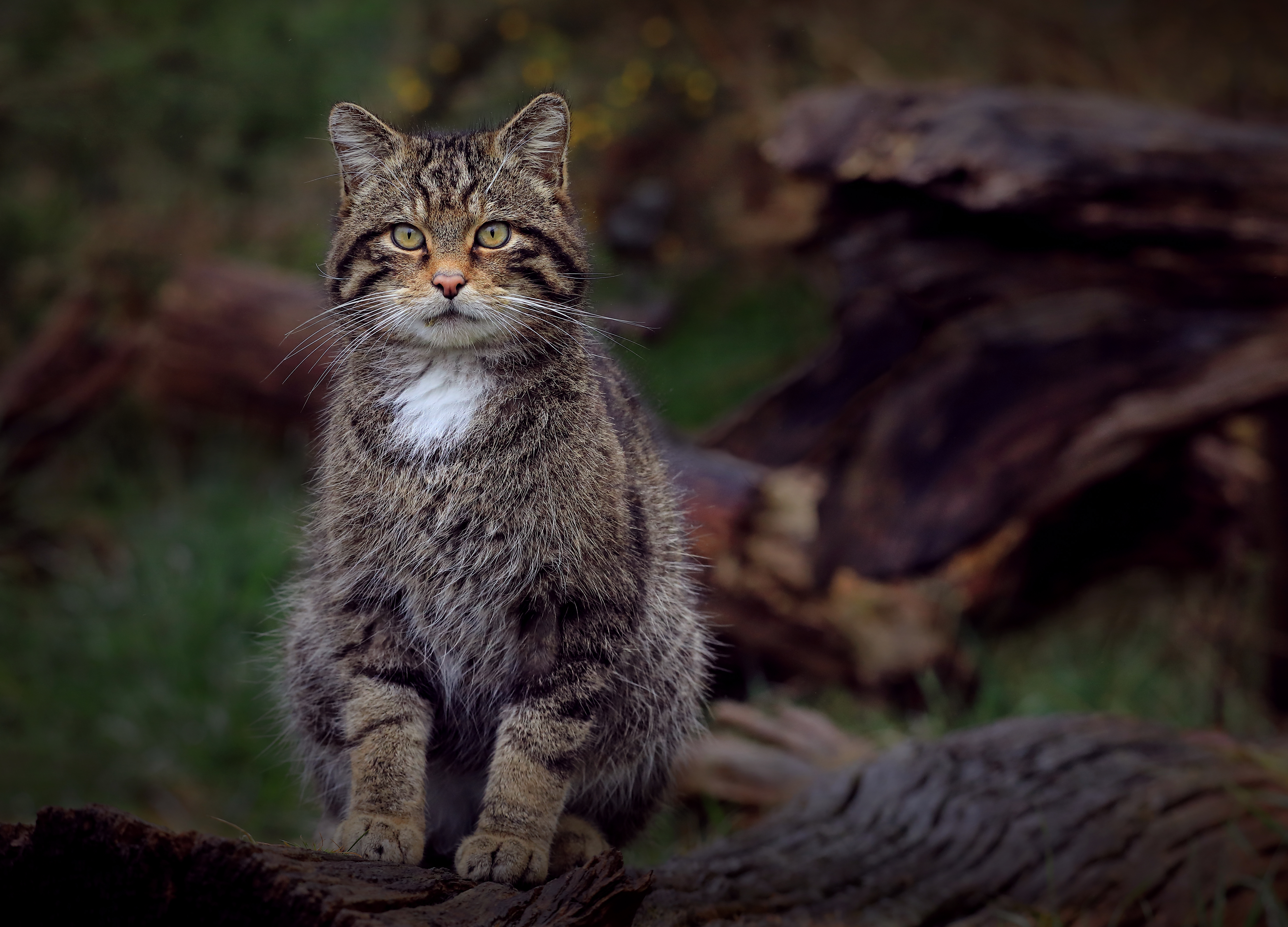
Scottish wildcat (Felis silvestris silvestris)

The representation of the weasel family (Mustelidae) in Scotland is typical of Britain as a whole save that the polecat is absent and that Scotland is the UK's stronghold of the pine marten, although the purity of the latter breed is threatened by a release of American martens in northern England. Scotland hosts the only populations of the Scottish wildcat (Felis silvestris silvestris) in the British Isles with numbers estimated at between 400 and 2,000 animals, and of the red fox subspecies Vulpes vulpes vulpes, a larger race than the more common V. v. crucigera and which has two distinct forms. The wildcat is at risk due to the inadequacy of protective legislation and is now considered at serious risk of extinction. In 2013 it was announced that the island of Càrna is to provide a sanctuary and breeding station in order to protect the species. Exterminations of the population of feral American mink, which were brought to Britain for fur farms in the 1950s, have been undertaken under the auspices of the Hebridean Mink Project and the Scottish Mink Initiative, which hopes to create a mink-free zone in a large area stretching from Wester Ross to Tayside.

Other than occasional vagrants, among the seals only the Phocidae, or earless seals, are represented. Two species, the grey seal and harbour or common seal, are present around the coast of Scotland in internationally important numbers. In 2002 the Scottish grey seal population was estimated at 120,600 adult animals, which is around 36% of the world population and more than 90% of the UK's. The Scottish population of the common seal is 29,700, about 90% of the UK and 36% of the European total.

=== Rodents, insectivores and lagomorphs ===
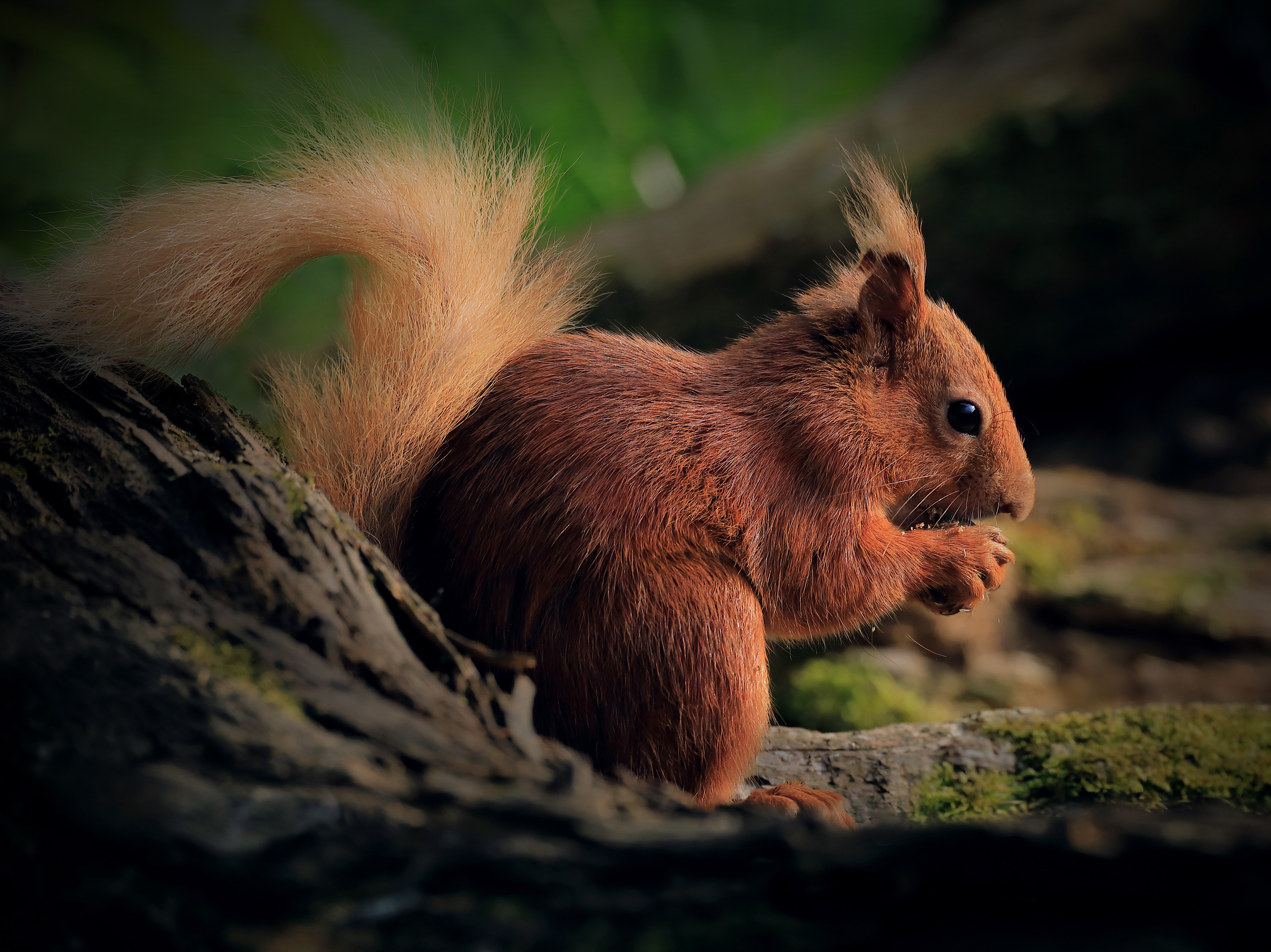
Red squirrel (Sciurus vulgaris)

Of the UK's red squirrels, 75% are found in Scotland. This species faces threats that include competition and disease from the introduced grey squirrel, and the 'Scottish Strategy for Red Squirrel Conservation' provides a framework for supporting its long-term conservation. Research in 2007 credited the growing population of pine martens with assisting this programme by preying selectively on the grey squirrels. Scotland has no population of the edible or hazel dormouse, or of the yellow-necked mouse, and the harvest mouse's range is limited to the southern part of the country. The St Kilda mouse and Orkney vole (see above) are endemic, but otherwise population distributions are similar to the rest of mainland Britain. Colonies of black rats are thought to now remain only on the island of Inchcolm in the Firth of Forth, after a successful eradication programme on the Shiant Isles.

Mainland insectivore populations are generally similar to the rest of Britain. Recent steps by NatureScot, the Scottish Executive and the Royal Society for the Protection of Birds to remove European hedgehogs from the Outer Hebrides, where their introduction has caused declines in internationally important breeding populations of wading seabird such as dunlin, ringed plover and redshank, has caused considerable controversy, and hedgehog culls were halted in 2007. The trapped animals are now relocated to the mainland. The programme has reduced this population; only two individuals were caught in 2007.

Of the lagomorphs only hares and rabbits are represented in Scotland. The mountain hare is the only native member of the hare family and is the dominant species throughout most of upland Scotland. The European hare and European rabbit are both present, the latter having been brought to Britain by the Romans but not becoming widespread in Scotland until the 19th century.

=== Artiodactyls ===
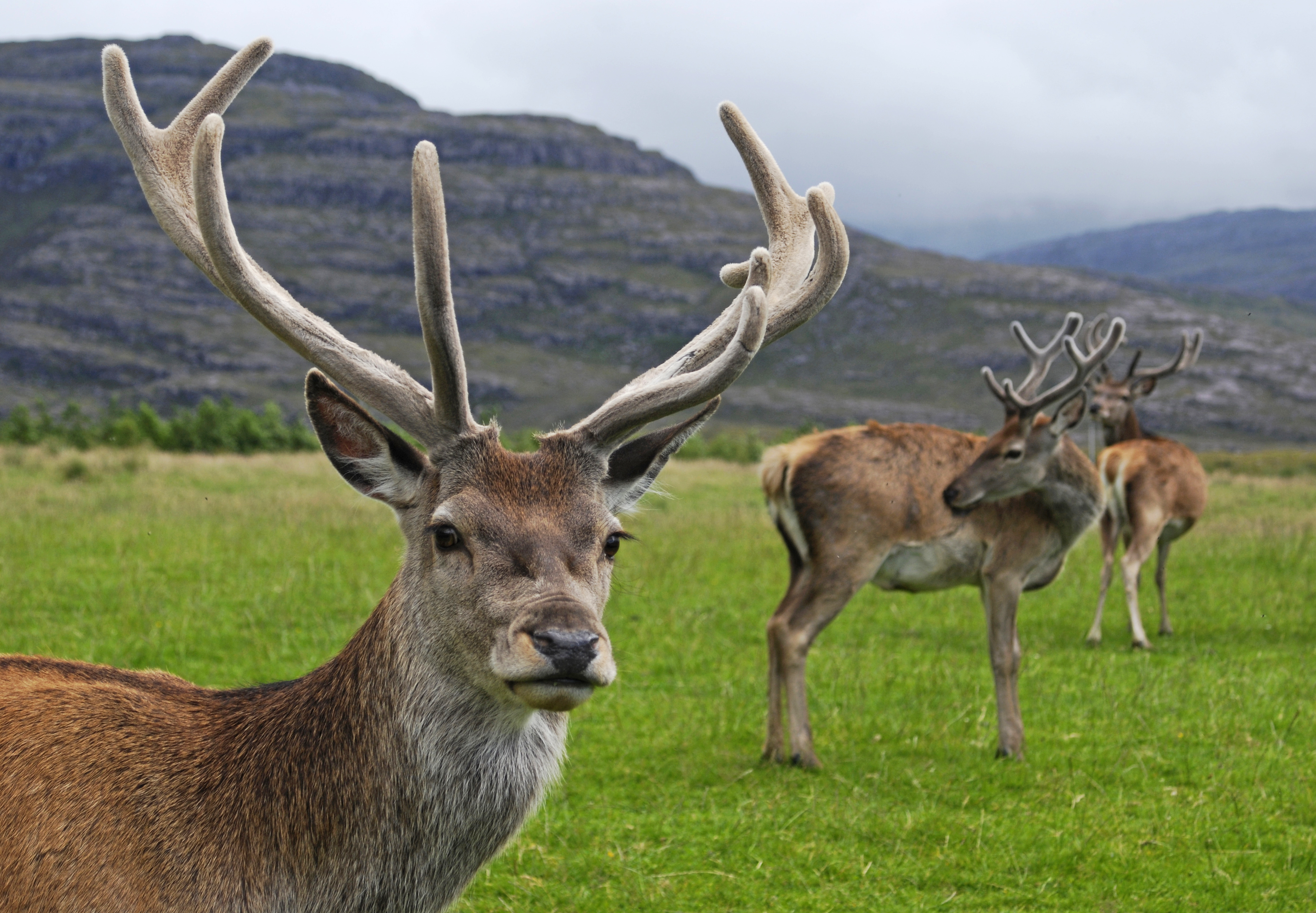
Scottish red deer stag (Cervus elaphus scoticus)

Four species of deer are found in Scotland: red, roe, fallow and sika, however only red and roe deer are native species. Shetland and Orkney do not have any wild deer population and the Outer Hebrides contain only red deer.

The population of red deer nationally is thought to be approximately 505,000 strong, with up to 300,000 roe, 25,000 sika and at least 8,000 fallow, although the red deer's existence in the pure form is threatened by hybridisation with introduced sika deer. Very much a hill-dwelling species in Scotland (and so typically smaller in stature than those found elsewhere in Europe), red deer are generally replaced by roe deer in lower-lying land. Although found elsewhere in the UK, no wild populations of Chinese water deer and no or very few Chinese muntjac exist in Scotland. It has isolated populations of feral goats Capra hircus and feral sheep (Ovis aries), such as the herd of 1,000 Soay sheep on St Kilda. Since 1952 a herd of reindeer have lived in the Cairngorm National Park, the species having become extinct in Scotland after it was recorded as having been hunted in Orkney in the 12th century.

=== Other mammals ===
Only nine of the sixteen or seventeen bat species found elsewhere in Britain are present in Scotland. Widespread species are common and soprano pipistrelles, the brown long-eared bat, Daubenton's bat and Natterer's bat. Those with a more restricted distribution are the whiskered bat, noctule, Leisler's bat and Nathusius's pipistrelle. Absences include the greater and lesser horseshoe bat, the greater mouse-eared bat and Bechstein's bat. No bats reside in the Shetland Islands; the only records there are of migrants or vagrants.

Twenty-one species of cetacean have been recorded in Scottish waters within the last 100 years including Cuvier's beaked whale, killer whales, sperm whales, minke whales and common, white-beaked and Risso's dolphins. The Moray Firth colony of about 100 bottlenose dolphins is the most northerly in the world. As recent dramatic television coverage indicated, this species preys on harbour porpoises; a third of the porpoise carcasses examined by pathologists from 1992 to 2002 indicated that death resulted from dolphin attacks. However, conservationists expressed dismay that the UK government decided to allow oil and gas prospecting in the Moray Firth, putting these populations of cetaceans at risk. In response, the government have placed seismic surveys "on hold" during 2009 pending further research. The introduced marsupial, the red-necked wallaby, is confined to a colony on an island in Loch Lomond.

=== Extinctions and reintroductions ===
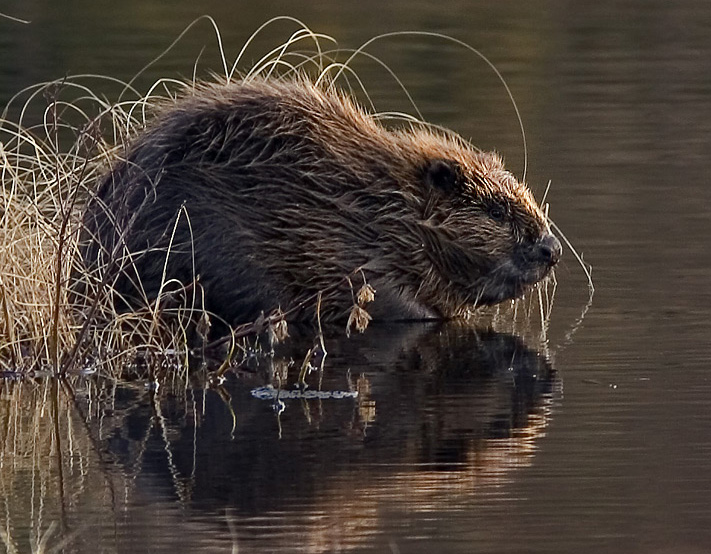
Eurasian beaver (Castor fiber)

During the Pleistocene interglacials, arctic animals that are no longer extant occupied Scotland, including the woolly rhinoceros, mammoth, polar bear, lemming, Arctic fox and the giant deer Megaloceros giganteus. Other mammals that used to inhabit Scotland but became extinct in the wild during historic times include the Eurasian lynx, which lived in Britain until 1,500 years ago, the European brown bear, subspecies Ursus arctos caledoniensis, which was taken to entertain the Roman circuses but died out in the 9th or 10th century, and the elk, which lasted until about 1300. The wild boar and aurochs or urus died out in the subsequent two centuries, although the former's domesticated cousin, the grice, lasted until 1930 in Shetland. The last known wolf was shot on Mackintosh land in Inverness-shire in 1743, and the walrus is now only an occasional vagrant. St Kilda also possessed an endemic subspecies of the house mouse, Mus musculus muralis, which was longer, hairier, coloured differently and had a skull shape at variance to the norm. It became extinct in 1938, just eight years after the evacuation of the native St Kildans.

A joint project of the Royal Zoological Society of Scotland, the Scottish Wildlife Trust and Forestry Commission Scotland have successfully re-introduced the European beaver to the wild in Scotland using Norwegian stock. The species was found in the Highlands until the 15th century, and although the then Scottish Government initially rejected the idea, a trial commenced in May 2009 in Knapdale. Separately, on Tayside, deliberate releases or escapes have led to up to 250 animals colonising the area. Although it was initially planned to remove these unofficially reintroduced beavers, in March 2012 the Scottish Government reversed the decision to remove beavers from the Tay, pending the outcome of studies into the suitability of re-introduction. Following receipt of the results of the studies, in November 2016 the Scottish Government announced that beavers could remain permanently, and would be given protected status as a native species within Scotland. As of June 2023, the beaver population is now thought to consist of approximately 1,500 individuals, spread across multiple catchments.

By means of escapes and/or illegal releases, wild boar (Sus scrofa) have been reintroduced to several areas of Scotland including a wide area of Lochaber and West Inverness-shire, however these populations are predominantly hybrids between S. scrofa and the domesticated pig (S. domesticus). NatureScot thus describes these animals as 'feral pigs'; an estimate of their numbers is not known. Various other schemes are under consideration. For example, the owner of the Alladale estate north of Inverness has expressed a desire to reintroduce wolves as part of a wilderness reserve, the first of its kind in Britain.

== Avifauna ==
The history of mammals suggests three broad overlapping phases: natural colonisation after the ice age, human-caused extinctions, and introduction by humans of non-native species. The greater mobility of birds makes such generalisations hard to substantiate in their case. Modern humans have done great damage to bird species, especially the raptors, but natural variations in populations are complex. For example, northern fulmars were present at Skara Brae during the Neolithic period, but in medieval times their breeding range was restricted to St Kilda. Since then they have spread throughout the British Isles.

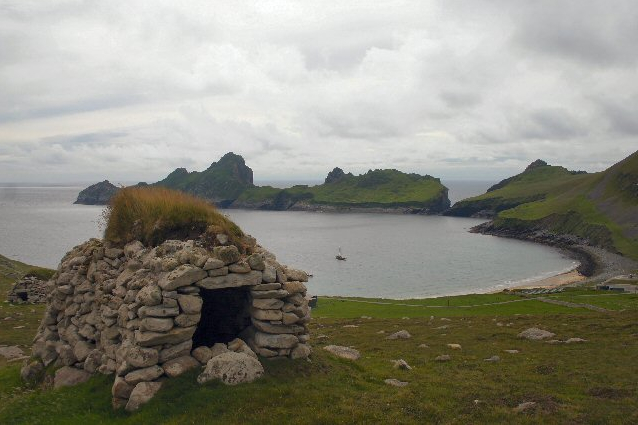
Village Bay, St Kilda, a World Heritage Site, and seabird haven

Most of about 250 species of bird regularly recorded in Britain venture into Scotland, and perhaps up to 300 more occur with varying degrees of rarity. A total of 247 species have been assessed and each placed onto one of three lists, red, amber or green, indicating the level of concern for their future. Forty species are red-listed, 121 are amber-listed and 86 are green-listed.

The Scottish crossbill, Loxia scotica, which inhabits the coniferous forests of the Highlands, is Britain's only endemic bird and, with only 300 breeding pairs, one of Europe's most threatened species. Its shape, red/green hue and habit of hanging upside down has led to comparisons with parrots. St Kilda has a unique subspecies of wren, the St Kilda wren Troglodytes troglodytes hirtensis, which has adapted to perching on the rocks and cliffs of this treeless Atlantic island, and consequently has developed larger and stronger feet than the mainland variant. It is also slightly larger, has a longer beak, a drabber though more varied colouring, and a "peculiarly sweet and soft" song. The subspecies was recognised in 1884 and was protected by a special Act of Parliament in 1904 to prevent its destruction "at the hands of ornithologists, egg-collectors, taxidermists and tourists".

=== Raptors ===
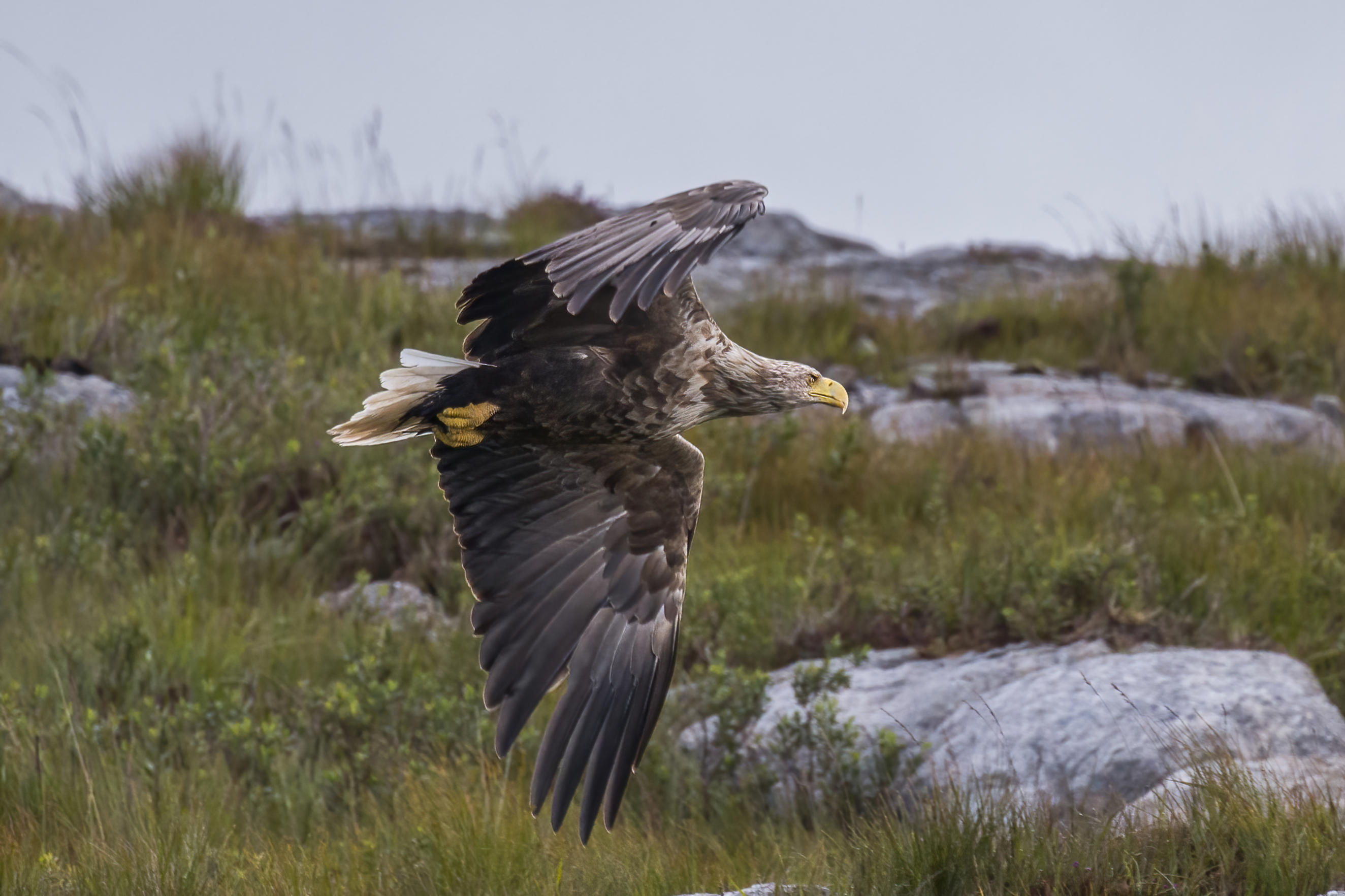
The white-tailed sea eagle (Haliaeetus albicilla). Reintroduced to Scotland from Norway after an absence of 60 years.

A 2015 report found that there are now more than 500 golden eagle pairs in Scotland. The hobby, marsh harrier and Montagu's harrier although found in England and Wales are generally absent.

In 1916 an English vicar stole the last native white-tailed sea eagle eggs on Skye, and the last adult was shot in Shetland two years later. However, the species was reintroduced to the island of Rùm in 1975. The bird spread successfully to various neighbouring islands, and 30 pairs were established by 2006. Despite fears expressed by local farmers, the Royal Society for the Protection of Birds (RSPB) are in process of releasing up to 100 young eagles on the east coast in the Forth and Tay estuaries. The red kite was exterminated in Scotland in 1879, and a reintroduction programme was launched by the RSPB in the 1980s. Although the species has made significant advances, it is estimated that 38% of the 395 birds fledged between 1999 and 2003 were poisoned and a further 9% shot or otherwise killed by humans. The RSPB stated: "it may take a custodial sentence before people engaged with this activity begin to take the matter seriously".

After an absence of nearly 40 years the osprey successfully re-colonised Scotland in the early 1950s. In 1899 they had bred at the ruined Loch an Eilean castle near Aviemore and at Loch Arkaig until 1908. In 1952 they claimed a new site at Loch Garten. There are now though to be between 250-300 breeding pairs.

Other raptor species found in the UK such as the kestrel, hen harrier, goshawk, sparrowhawk, tawny owl, and barn owl are widely distributed in Scotland, although the little owl is confined to the south. Buzzards have displayed a remarkable resilience, having recovered from human persecution and the myxomatosis epidemic of the 1950s, which reduced their food supply. Numbers more than trebled between 1978 and 1998. At the other end of the population scale, a single pair of snowy owls bred on Fetlar from 1967 to 1975.

In 2009 it was reported that the Scottish Government have decided to proceed with a controversial plan to relocate sparrowhawks found near pigeon lofts in Glasgow, Edinburgh, Kilmarnock, Stirling and Dumfries at a cost of £25,000.

=== Seabirds ===
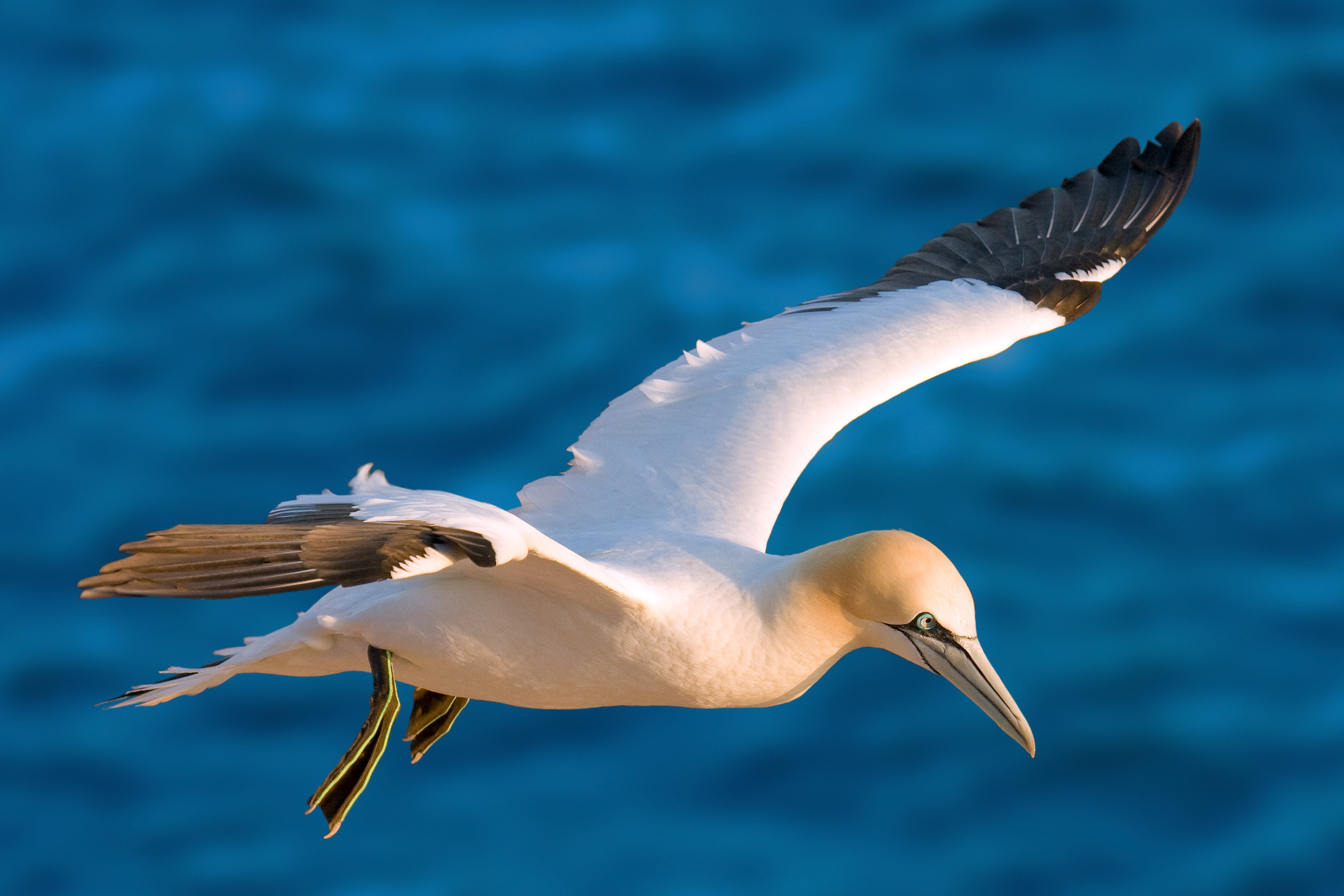
Northern gannet (Morus bassanus)

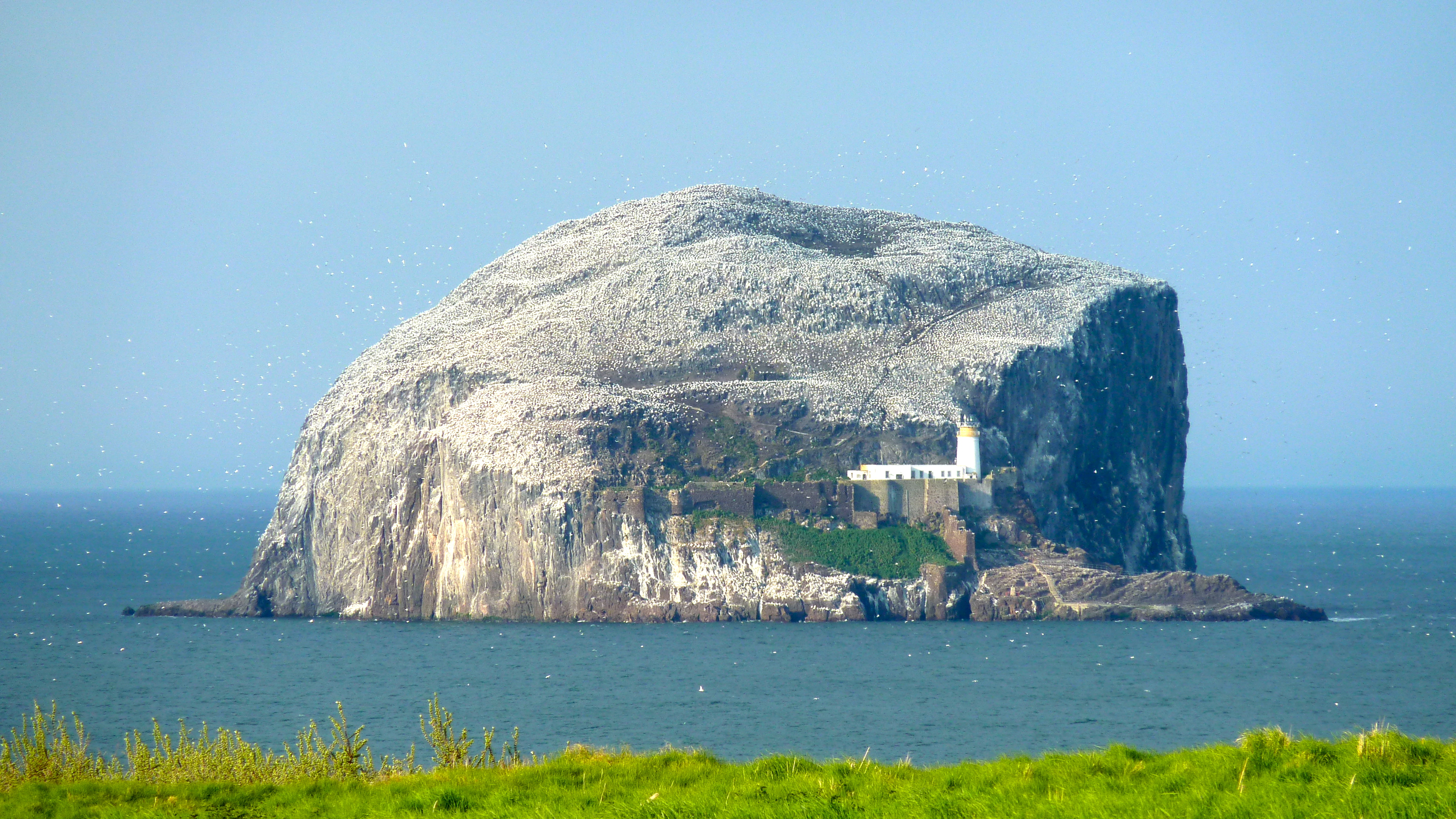
The Bass Rock from North Berwick

Scotland's seas host almost half of the European Union's breeding seabirds including about half of the world's northern gannets and a third of the world's Manx shearwaters. Four seabird species have more than 95% of their combined British and Irish population in Scotland, while a further fourteen species have more than half of their breeding population in Scottish colonies. St Kilda, which is a World Heritage Site, is a seabird haven of great significance. It has 60,000 northern gannets, amounting to 24% of the world population, 49,000 breeding pairs of Leach's storm petrel, up to 90% of the European population, 136,000 pairs of puffin and 67,000 northern fulmar pairs, about 30% and 13% of the respective UK totals. The island of Mingulay also has a large seabird population and is an important breeding ground for razorbills, with 9,514 pairs, 6.3% of the European population.

Of all breeding bonxies 60% nest in Scotland, mostly in Orkney and Shetland, even though they did not arrive at all until the 18th century. Scotland is the breeding station for about 90% of the UK's Arctic terns, the majority of which make use of colonies in Orkney and Shetland. A similar percentage of the UK's tysties breed on Scottish islands including Unst, Mingulay and Iona. Scotland also hosts 1,000 pairs of Arctic skua and 21,000 breeding pairs of shag, 40% of the global population of the species.

In excess of 130,000 birds inhabit Fowlsheugh nature reserve in Aberdeenshire at the peak of the breeding season, making it one of the largest seabird colonies in Britain. There are significant numbers of kittiwake, Atlantic puffin, razorbill, fulmar, herring gull and great black-backed gull. The Bass Rock in the Firth of Forth hosts upwards of 40,000 pairs of northern gannets and is the largest single rock gannetry in the world. The bird's scientific name Morus bassanus, derives from the rock.

=== Game birds, waders and water fowl ===
Red-listed western capercaillie and ptarmigan breed in Scotland and are absent elsewhere in the British Isles. The former became extinct in Scotland in 1785 but was successfully reintroduced from Swedish stock in 1837. There are significant populations of other Galliformes including black grouse and the famous red grouse. Common quail, grey partridge and pheasant are well-distributed, although the red-legged partridge is less so. A small colony of the introduced golden pheasant exists in the southwest.

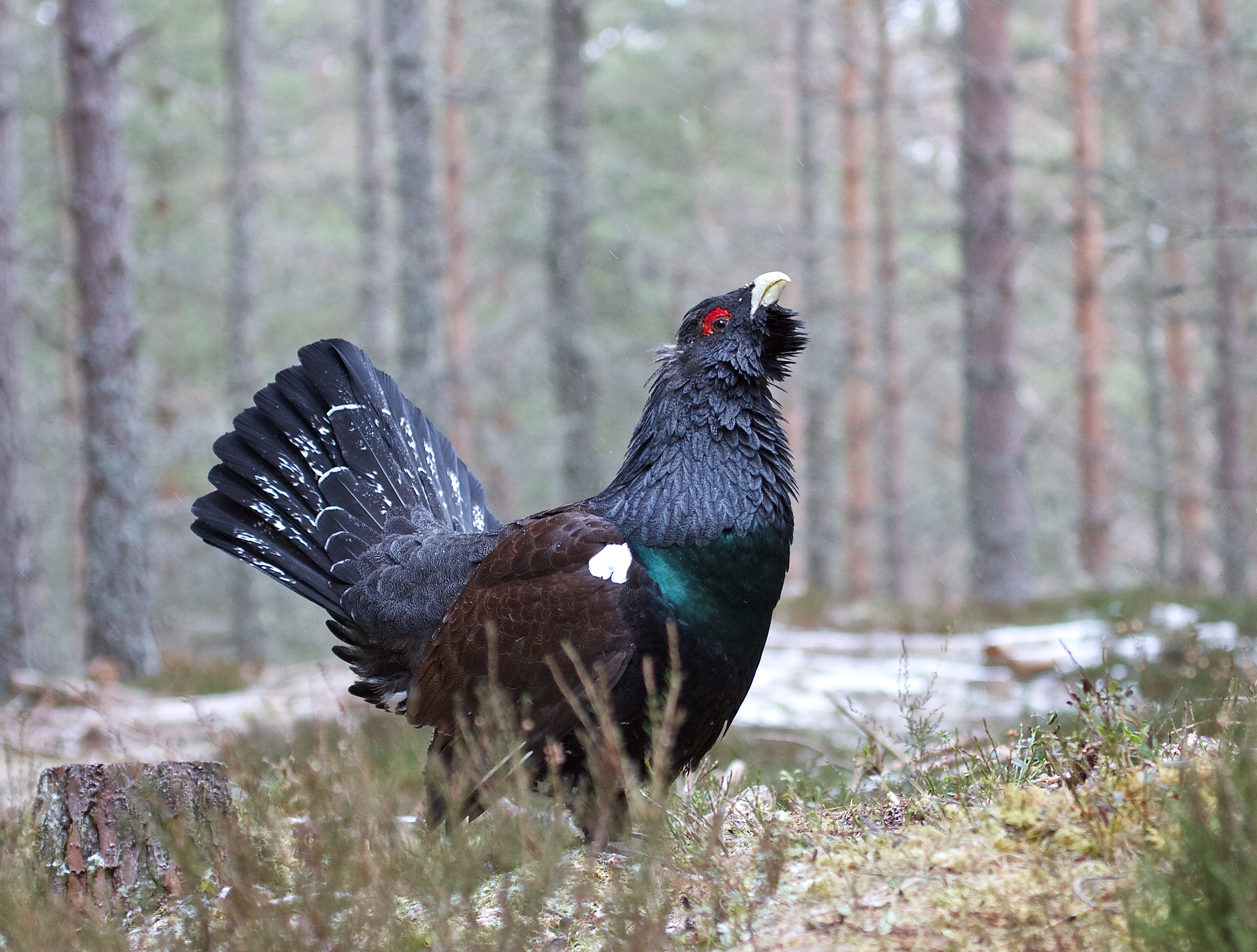
Male western capercaillie (Tetrao urogallus)

Among the waders, avocet, stone-curlew, little ringed plover and Kentish plover are absent, but most of the 100 or so pairs of dotterel in the UK spend their summers in Scotland as do all of the breeding Eurasian whimbrel, greenshank and red-necked phalarope, (although the latter two species also breed in Ireland). In summer the shallow lochs of the machair lands in the Uists and Benbecula provide for a remarkable variety of waders and ducks including shoveler and eider. The rare Slavonian grebe and common scoter breed on a small number of lochs in Highland region. Goldeneye have colonised an area centred around the Cairngorms National Park since the 1970s, and about 100 pairs breed there. The majority of the roughly 25,000 whooper swans in the British Isles winter in Scotland and Ireland.

About half of the 80,000 barnacle geese, which breed in Greenland, arrive on Islay for the winter, with further flocks wintering on other Scottish islands (e.g. Uists, Tiree, Colonsay) and many thousands wintering in Ireland. Tens of thousands of pink-footed geese use the Montrose Basin as a winter roost in October and November as they do Loch Strathbeg and various lochs and reservoirs in Tayside and the Lothians. The amber-listed black and red-throated diver's freshwater breeding strongholds in the British Isles are in the north and west of Scotland.

=== Other non-passerines ===
Considerable efforts have been taken to conserve the shy corncrake, and summer numbers of this red-listed species have recovered to over 1200 pairs. The wryneck is now almost extinct in Scotland with one or two birds singing each summer, but not breeding. Of the Columbidae the turtle dove is largely absent, but in the British Isles the rock dove is confined to the north and west coasts of Scotland and Ireland.

=== Passerines ===
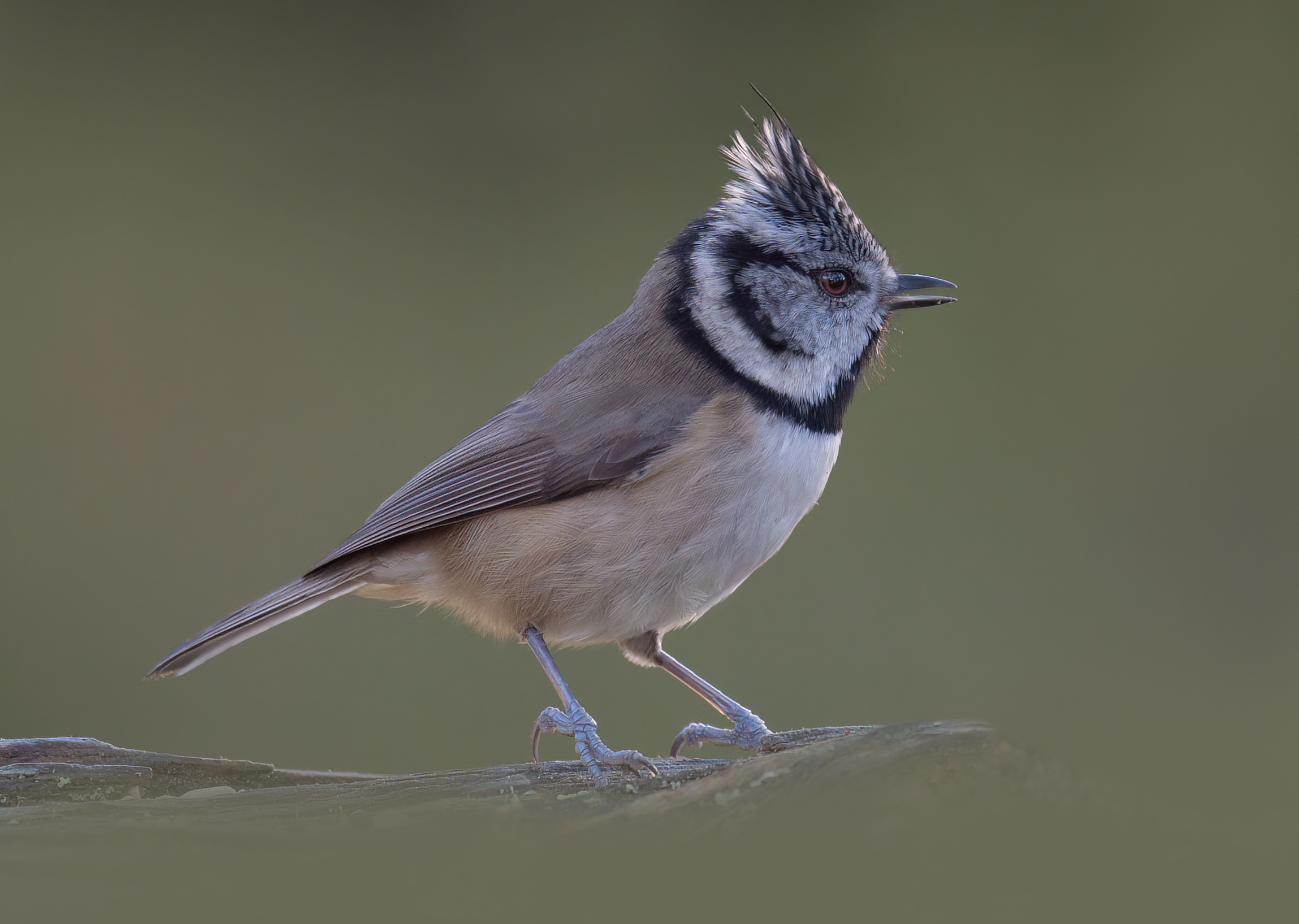
Crested tit (Lophophanes cristatus)

Ravens are typically forest-dwelling birds in much of Europe, but in Scotland they are generally associated with mountains and sea coasts. In 2002 the hooded crow was recognised as a separate species from the carrion crow. Scotland and Northern Ireland host all of the approximately 190,000 UK territories of the former. A recent survey suggest that raven numbers are increasing but that hooded crows had declined by 59% while carrion crow numbers were essentially static. Concentrated on the islands of Islay and Colonsay, about 80 of Britain's 400 pairs of red-billed chough nest in Scotland.

In addition to crossbills (see above), crested tits exist as a fragmented population of 2,400 breeding pairs in remnant patches of Caledonian Forest and in some larger plantations such as the Culbin Forest in Moray. Ring ouzels have declined to around 7,000 pairs, possibly due to disturbance from the growing number of human visitors to their upland habitat. There are fewer than 100 breeding pairs of snow bunting, although in winter they are joined by migrants from continental Europe. A nest site near Dumfries is thought to have been in use by dippers since 1881. Scotland has 95% of the British breeding population of red-listed twite, about 64,000 pairs. However, a recent RSPB survey found a sudden and dramatic fall in winter numbers from 6,000 in 1998 to only 300 in 2006 in the counties of Caithness and Sutherland.

=== Vagrants ===
Scotland's position on the western seaboard of Europe means that a variety of birds not normally found in the country visit from time to time. These include accidental visits by vagrant birds that have wandered far from their normal habitations.

Fair Isle is an internationally renowned site for the observation of migrant birds. Rarities have included passerines such as the thick-billed warbler, white-throated sparrow, yellow-rumped warbler and collared flycatcher. More than 345 species of bird have been recorded on this island, which measures only 7.68 square kilometres (2.97 mi^{2}).

Elsewhere, other rarities reported in 2006 include a white-billed diver at Gairloch, a black-browed albatross in the Western Isles, a laughing gull in Shetland and a buff-breasted sandpiper at Lossiemouth. Accidentals recorded in earlier years include an American bittern in 1888 and a purple heron in the same year, a Baikal teal in 1958, and a black stork in 1977. Birds are also presumed to have escaped from captivity, such as a lanner falcon in 1976, Chilean flamingos in 1976 and 1979, a black-necked swan in 1988, and a red-tailed hawk in 1989. These records are but a small selection from two counties in the north-east and give only a flavour of the complexity and diversity of avian life in Scotland.

=== Extinctions ===
The common crane and Eurasian bittern were exterminated by hunters and the draining of marshes in the 18th century. The last great auk seen in Britain was killed on Stac an Armin, a rocky pinnacle in the St Kilda archipelago in July 1840.

== Fish and marine life ==
Of the 42 species of fish found in Scottish fresh waters, only half have arrived by natural colonisation. Native species include allis shad, brown trout, European eel and river lamprey. Scottish rivers support one of the largest Atlantic salmon resources in Europe, with nearly 400 rivers supporting genetically distinct populations. Five fish species are considered 'late arrivals' to Scotland, having colonised by natural means prior to 1790. They are the northern pike, roach, stone loach, European perch, and minnow. Rarer native species include the endemic Salvelinus killinensis and the powan, the latter found in only two locations and under threat from introduced ruffe and the Arctic charr. The latter may have been the first fish species to re-enter fresh waters when the last ice age ended, and about 200 populations exist.

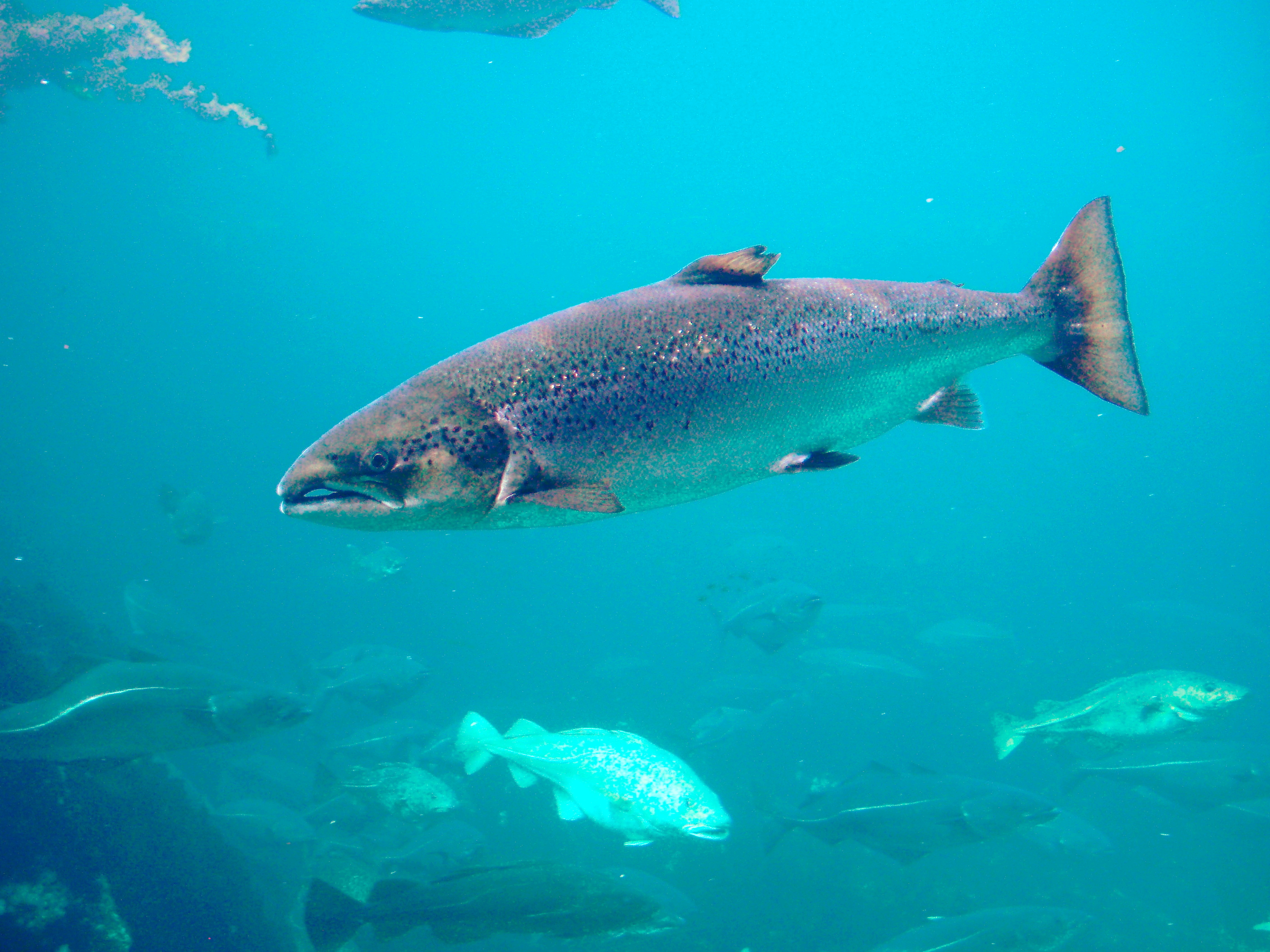
Atlantic salmon (Salmo salar)

The freshwater pearl mussel was once abundant enough to support commercial activities, and Scotland is the remaining European stronghold with about half the global number present. There are populations in more than 50 rivers, mainly in the Highlands, although illegal harvesting has seriously affected their survival.

Scotland's seas, which constitute an area greater than that of the seas around the rest of the UK, are among the most biologically productive in the world. They are home to a third of the world's whale and dolphin species, most of the UK's maerl, (a collective term for several species of calcified red seaweed, and an important marine habitat), Horsemussel (Modiolus modiolus) and seagrass beds, and distinctive species like the tall sea pen, Funiculina quadrangularis. It is estimated that the total number of Scottish marine species exceeds 40,000. This includes 250 species of fish, the most numerous inshore variety being saithe, and deeper water creatures such as the dogfish, porbeagle and blue shark, European eel, sea bass, Atlantic halibut and various rays. There are four species of sea turtle, the leatherback, loggerhead, Kemp's ridley and green turtle. Scottish waters contain around 2,500 crustacean species and 700 molluscs and in 2012 a bed of 100 million flame shells was found during a survey of Loch Alsh.

The Darwin Mounds, an important area of cold water coral reefs discovered in 1988, are about 1,000 metres (3,300 ft) deep in the Atlantic Ocean, about 185 kilometres (115 mi) north-west of Cape Wrath in the north-east corner of the Rockall Trough. The area covers approximately 100 square kilometres (39 mi^{2}) and contains hundreds of mounds of about 100 metres (330 ft) in diameter and 5 metres (16 ft) in height, many having a teardrop shaped 'tail' orientated south-west of the mound. This feature may be unique globally. The tops of the mounds have living stands of Lophelia corals and support significant populations of the single-celled Syringammina fragilissima. Fish have been observed in the vicinity but not at higher densities than the background environment. Damage from trawler fishing was visible over about a half of the eastern Darwin Mounds surveyed during summer 2000, and the UK government is taking steps to protect the area. In 2003 the European Commission provided emergency protection and banned damaging fishing activity in the locality.

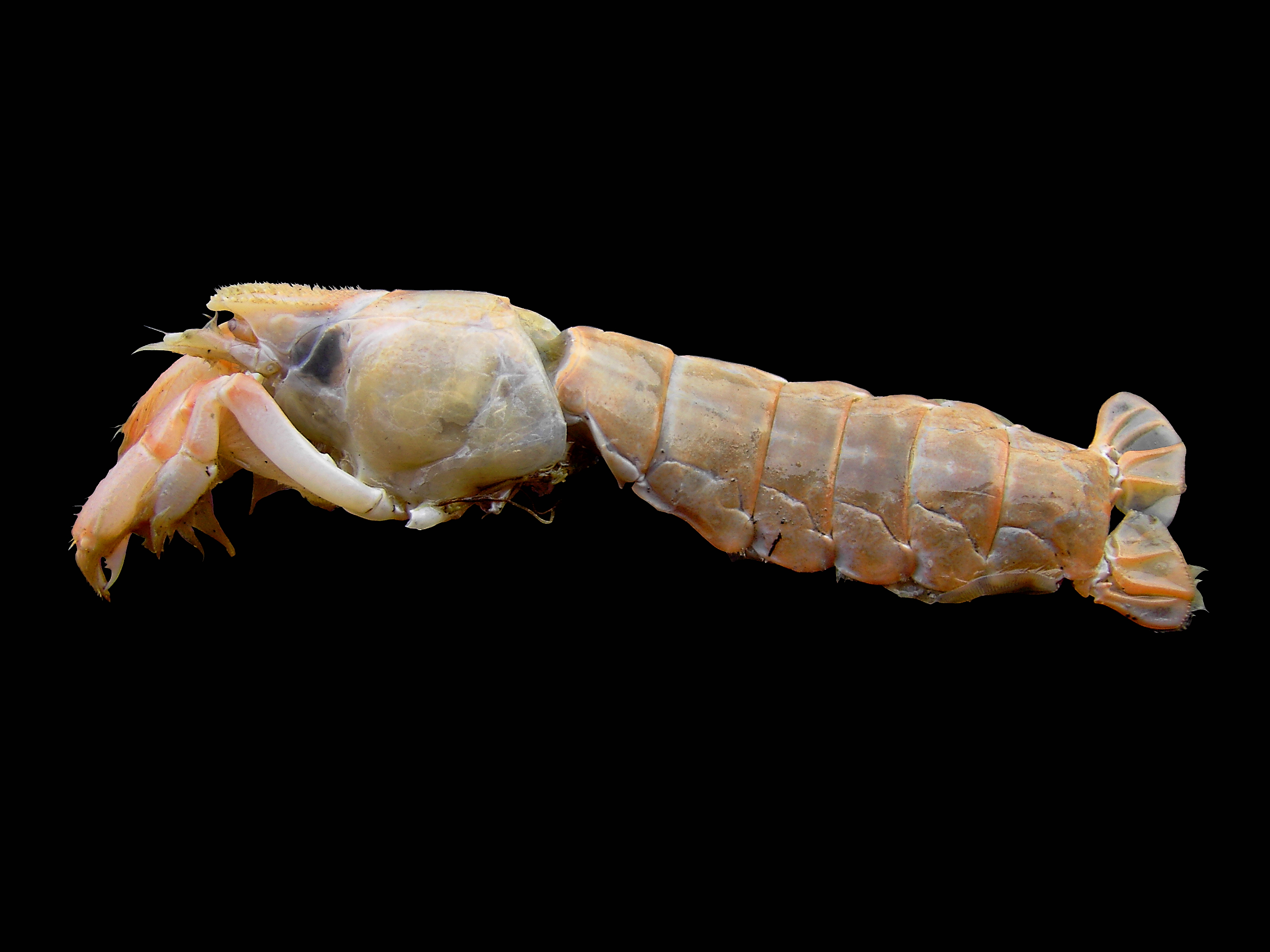
Upogebia deltaura, a mud lobster commonly found in Scottish maerl beds

Further action on a much wider scale may be required. According to a recent report "Scotland's marine life could be almost wiped out within 50 years unless tough action is taken to manage the way humans use the seas". Fears were expressed by a consortium of environmental organisations that commercial fish stocks, including Atlantic cod are suffering from over-fishing, that fish farming, especially for salmon is damaging the aquatic environment, a reduction in coastal marsh habitats is affecting marine bird life, litter in densely populated estuaries such as the Firth of Clyde is affecting all forms of marine life and that the growth in off-shore tourism was deleterious to populations of, for example, basking shark. A call was made for a 'Scottish Marine Bill' to co-ordinate and manage human activity at sea and to provide more protected areas such as marine national parks. The Marine (Scotland) Act 2010 was subsequently passed by the Scottish Parliament.

Calyptraea chinensis (L.) is a gastropod that has invaded the shores of Scotland and by 1998 had reached nearly as far north as Oban. One living specimen was found at Clachan Sound, and earlier records showed findings of gastropod shells.

=== Riverine extinctions ===
Pollution and predation led to the extinction of both species of vendace from its very restricted range in south-western Scottish freshwaters in 1980. In the 1990s a successful attempt to reintroduce Coregonus vandesius to the Lochmaben area began. Coregonus albula remains absent.

Salvelinus inframundus, a rare char species that is now extinct, had been found in Loch Mealt, Isle of Skye, Scottish Highlands.

== Amphibians and land reptiles ==
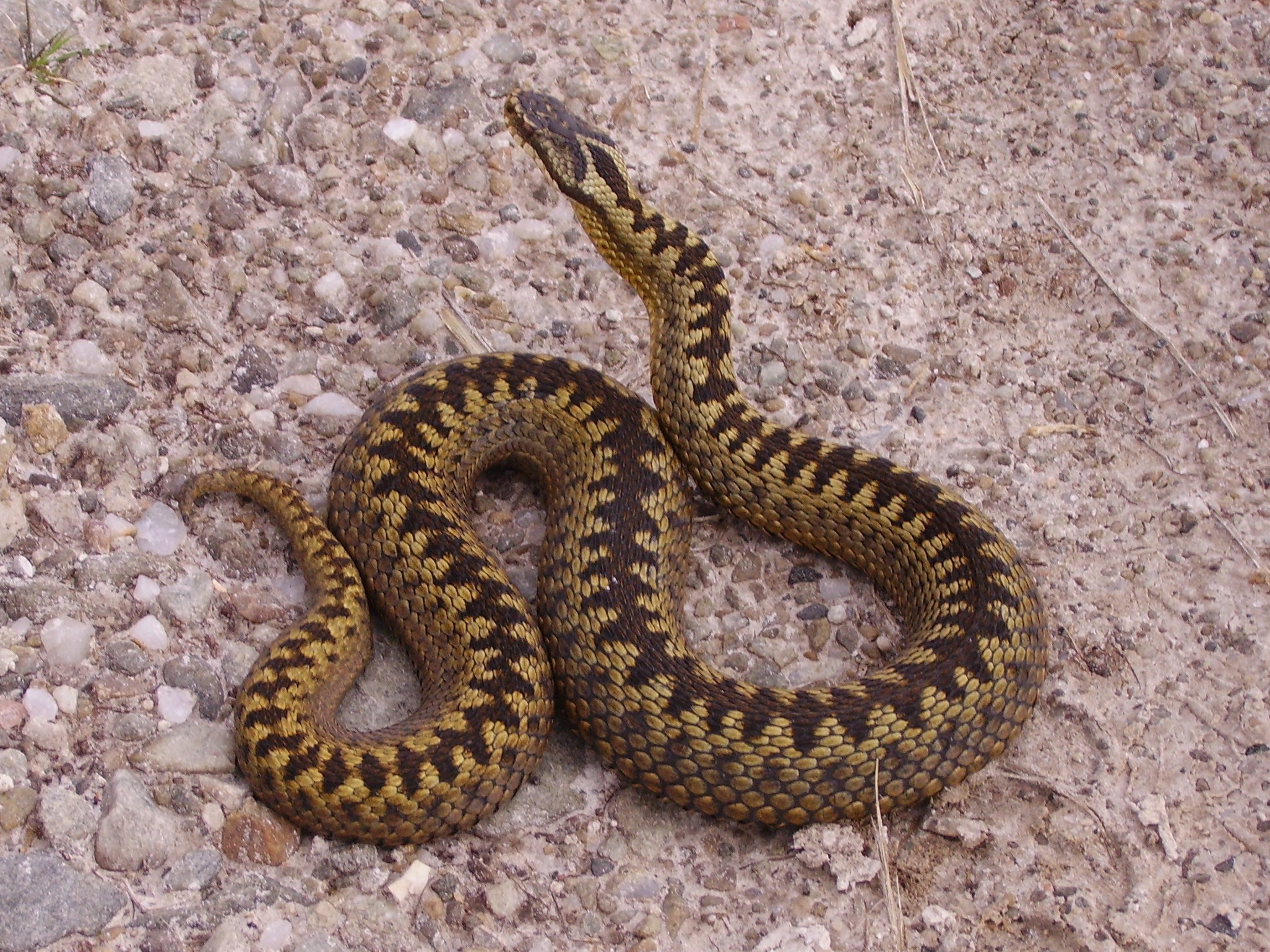
Adder (Vipera berus)

Only six amphibians and four land reptiles are native to Scotland. The amphibians include three species of newt: the great crested, of which fewer than 1,000 individuals survive; the smooth, and the palmate. The other amphibians are the common toad, the natterjack toad, found in only four locations in the south-west, and the common frog. A single alien amphibian is known in Scotland, the Alpine newt, a recent escapee confined to the Edinburgh area.

The reptiles include the adder and the grass snake, the slowworm, which is a legless lizard, and the common lizard. Smooth snakes, found elsewhere in the UK are absent, and grass snakes are rarely reported.

== Terrestrial invertebrates ==
Seventy-seven species of land snail and an estimated 14,000 species of insect live in Scotland, none of them "truly" endemic. These include Pardosa lugubris, a species of wolf spider first found in the UK in 2000 at Abernethy Forest nature reserve, and the Scottish wood ant. These ants, which are the most numerous residents of the Caledonian pine forest, build mounds from the pine cones and needles they find on the forest floor and may inhabit the mounds for decades. A single colony may collect 100,000 insects a day to feed its half million citizens and produce up to 250 kilograms (550 lb) of honeydew per season.

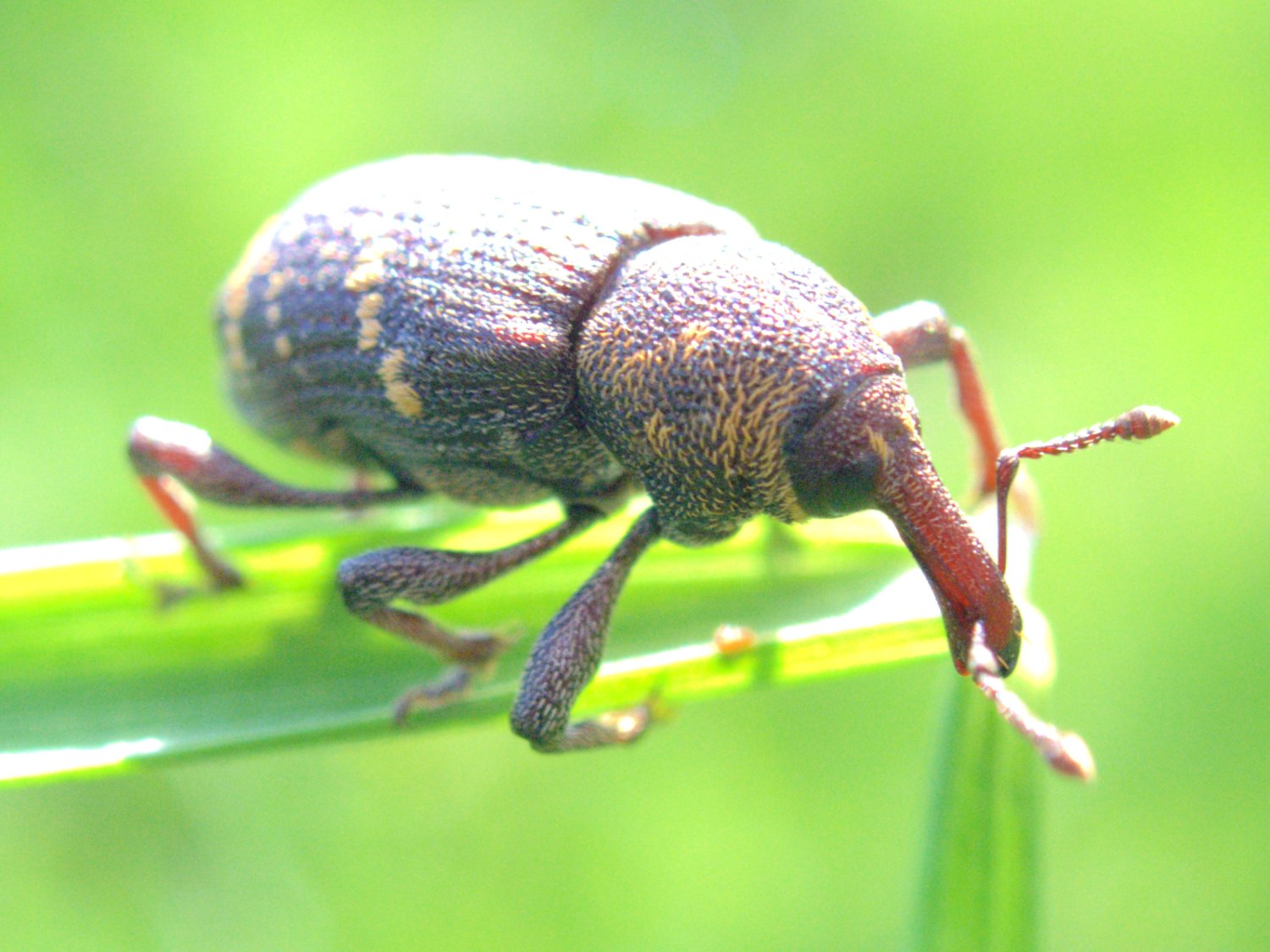
Pine weevil (Hylobius abietis)

In addition to the Scottish wood ant, several Scottish species of invertebrate exist that are otherwise rare in the UK and important enough to have a specific "Action Plan" to provide protection. These are five species of ant and bee, six moths and butterfly, five flies and a single beetle (the reed beetle) and snail (the round-mouthed whorl snail, Vertigo genesii). Northern colletes is a rare species of bee, the most significant British habitat for which is in the Outer Hebrides, where there are more than ten colonies. Scotland is also the UK stronghold of the Blaeberry bumblebee, and the Bumblebee Conservation Trust recently created the world's first sanctuary for this genus of insects at RSPB Vane Farm Nature Reserve near Loch Leven. The bumblebee Bombus jonellus var. hebridensis is endemic to the Hebrides. In 2010, a colony of the beetle Meloe brevicollis was found on the island of Coll. The species is otherwise extinct in Scotland and is also flightless, raising the question of how the colony arrived on the island. The northern February red stonefly (Brachyptera putata) has recently lost its range elsewhere in Britain and is now it considered to be a Scottish endemic.

Although many species of butterfly are in decline in the UK, recent research suggests that some, such as the pearl-bordered fritillary, marsh fritillary and chequered skipper, which are becoming rare in the rest of the UK, are moving north into Scotland in response to climate change. In June 2008 an adult Ethmia pyrausta moth was discovered in Easter Ross. This find was only the fifth sighting since its discovery in the UK at Loch Shin in 1853, and the species has gained "almost mythical status" according to Butterfly Conservation Scotland.

The most well-known invertebrate may be a species of midge (Culicoides impunctatus), a tiny flying gnat that is the scourge of summer visitors and residents alike. Its predations result in the loss of up to 20% of summer working days in the forestry industry. Others of significance include the pine weevil, black pine beetle, clytra beetle, and the timberman, a long-horned beetle. The archaeological site at Skara Brae provided the earliest known record of the human flea, Pulex irritans in Europe.

The islands of Colonsay and Oronsay are home to about 50 colonies of the only native species of honeybee in Britain–Apis mellifera mellifera. The Scottish Government introduced the Bee Keeping (Colonsay and Oronsay) Order 2013 to protect the species from cross-breeding and disease as the species has suffered serious declines on the mainland.

== Cryptozoology ==
Sketch of the Stronsay Beast made by Sir Alexander Gibson in 1808

A variety of exotic felids are rumoured to exist, including the 'Beast of Buchan'. The 'Kellas cat' of Moray is a jet black, long-legged animal, and is probably the result of a modern wildcat/domestic cat hybrid, or a melanistic wildcat. In earlier times it may have spawned the legend of the cat-sìth or "Fairy Cat". The fabulous Loch Ness Monster, possibly a form of "water horse", has a long history; the first recorded sighting allegedly took place in 565 AD. More recently, the Stronsay Beast was an unidentified cryptid washed ashore in the Orkney islands in the 19th century.

== Nature conservation in Scotland ==
=== Challenges ===
Conservation of the natural environment is well-developed in the United Kingdom. During the Victorian era, few animal species became extinct in Scotland, however the scale of ecological degradation was considerable. Richard Perry records that on a single estate in the Cairngorms, between 1837 and 1840, the following "vermin" were exterminated by gamekeepers:

246 Martens, 198 Wild Cats, 106 Polecats, 67 Badgers, 58 Otters, 475 Ravens, 462 Kestrels, 371 Rough-legged Buzzards, 285 Common Buzzards, 275 Kites, 98 Peregrine Falcons, 92 Hen Harriers, 78 Merlins, 71 Short-eared Owls, 63 Goshawks, 35 Long-eared Owls, 27 Sea Eagles, 18 Ospreys, 15 Golden Eagles, 11 Hobbys, 6 Gyrfalcons, 5 Marsh Harriers, 3 Honey Buzzards,

as well as:

11 Foxes, 301 Stoats and Weasels, 78 House Cats, 1,431 Hooded or Carrion Crow, 3 Barn Owls, 8 Magpies and 7 "Orange-legged Falcons".

In recent decades, the scale of the decline across much of Scotland's fauna has been observed and better understood, such as through the RSPB's State of Nature report, which states that 11 of Scottish species are threatened with extinction. The Scottish Government has acknowledged the twin crises of climate change and biodiversity loss.

=== Conservation organisations ===
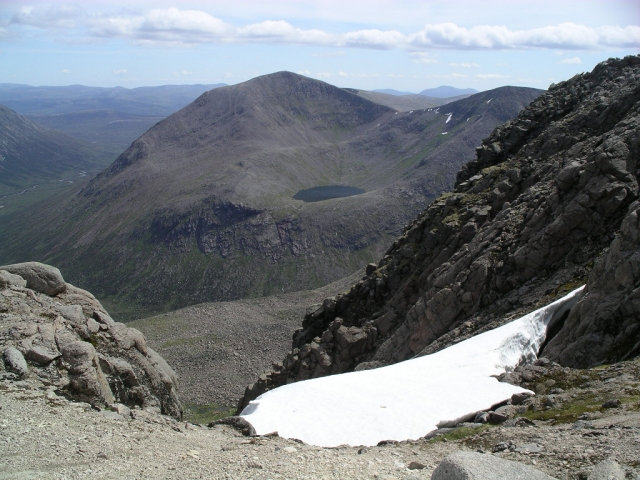
The High Cairngorms – Cairn Toul and Sgor an Lochain Uaine from Braeriach

Various public sector organisations have an important role in the stewardship of the country's fauna. NatureScot is the statutory body responsible for natural heritage management in Scotland. One of its duties is to establish national nature reserves (NNR)s. Until 2004 there were 73, but a review carried out in that year resulted in a significant number of sites losing their NNR status, and by 2006 there were 55. As of 2018 there are 43. Forestry and Land Scotland serves as the forestry department of the Scottish Government and is one of the country's largest landowners. The Joint Nature Conservation Committee is the statutory adviser to Government on UK and international nature conservation.

The country has two national parks. Cairngorms National Park includes the largest area of arctic mountain landscape in the UK. Sites designated as of importance to natural heritage take up 39% of the land area, two-thirds of which are of Europe-wide importance. Loch Lomond and the Trossachs National Park includes Britain's largest body of fresh water, the mountains of Breadalbane and the sea lochs of Argyll.

Charitable and voluntary organisations also have important roles to play. The National Trust for Scotland is the conservation charity that protects and promotes Scotland's natural and cultural heritage. With more than 270,000 members it is the largest conservation charity in Scotland. The Scottish Wildlife Trust is a leading voluntary conservation organisation, working to protect Scotland's natural environment. The Royal Zoological Society of Scotland is a learned society and registered charity that maintains Edinburgh Zoo and the Highland Wildlife Park (a safari park and zoo near Kingussie, which specialises in native fauna). The Society is also involved in various conservation programs around Scotland and the world. The Royal Society for the Protection of Birds promotes conservation of birds and other wildlife through the protection and re-creation of habitats. The John Muir Trust is a charity whose main role is as a guardian of wild land and wildlife, through the ownership of land and the promotion of education and conservation. The trust owns and manages estates in locations including Knoydart and Assynt, and on the isle of Skye. It has links with the Sierra Club in the United States, which also celebrates the legacy of Dunbar-born John Muir. Trees for Life is a charity that aims to restore a "wild forest" in the Northwest Highlands and Grampian Mountains.

== See also ==
- British avifauna
- Climate of Scotland
- Flora of Scotland
- Geography of Scotland
- Geology of Scotland
- Nature of the Outer Hebrides
- List of British amphibians
- List of British birds
- List of British butterflies
- List of British mammals
- List of British reptiles
- List of extinct animals of Britain
- List of fauna of the Scottish Highlands
- Lists of insects recorded in Britain
- List of moths of Great Britain (Arctiidae)
- List of moths of Great Britain (Geometridae)
- National nature reserve (Scotland)
- Royal Society for the Protection of Birds reserves in Scotland
