= List of fauna of the Scottish Highlands =

This is a list of fauna of the Scottish Highlands.

== Mammals ==
- Eurasian beaver (reintroduced)
- European badger
- Eurasian otter
- Short-tailed field vole
- British primitive goat
- Eurasian wolf (extinct)
- American mink (invasive)
- Moose (reintroduced)
- Mountain hare
- European pine marten
- Scottish red deer
- Red fox
- Red squirrel
- Mountain reindeer (reintroduced)
- Roe deer
- Scottish wildcat
- Sheep
- Stoat
- European water vole
- Scottish highland cattle

== Birds ==
- Black grouse
- Black-throated diver
- Common buzzard
- Western capercaillie
- Common gull
- Common sandpiper
- Common cuckoo
- Eurasian curlew
- White-throated dipper
- Eurasian dotterel
- Dunlin
- Golden eagle
- Great skua
- Common greenshank
- Greylag goose
- Hen harrier
- Hooded crow
- Meadow pipit
- Merlin
- Osprey
- Peregrine falcon
- Ptarmigan
- Common raven
- Red grouse
- Red kite (reintroduced)
- Red-throated diver
- Ring ouzel
- Scottish crossbill — endemic
- Common snipe
- Snow bunting
- European stonechat
- Northern wheatear
- White-tailed eagle

== Reptiles ==
- Adder
- Viviparous lizard

== Amphibians ==
- Common frog
- Palmate newt

== Fish ==
- Charr
- Salmon
- Trout

== Insects ==
=== Beetles ===
- Green tiger beetle
- Ground beetle

=== Bees ===
- Bilberry bumblebee
- Heath bumblebee
- Tree bumblebee

=== Butterflies and moths ===
- Large heath butterfly
- Mountain ringlet butterfly
- Scotch argus butterfly
- Black mountain moth
- Emperor moth
- Fox moth
- Magpie moth
- Mountain burnet moth
- Northern dart moth
- Northern eggar moth

=== Dragonflies ===
- Azure hawker dragonfly
- Four-spotted chaser dragonfly
- Golden-ringed dragonfly

=== Other ===
- Cranefly
- Deer ked
- Midge
- Sheep tick

== Sources ==
- Kempe and Wrightham, Hostile Habitats: Scotland's Mountain Environment Scottish Mountaineering Trust 2006, ISBN 0-907521-93-2

== See also ==
- Fauna of Scotland
