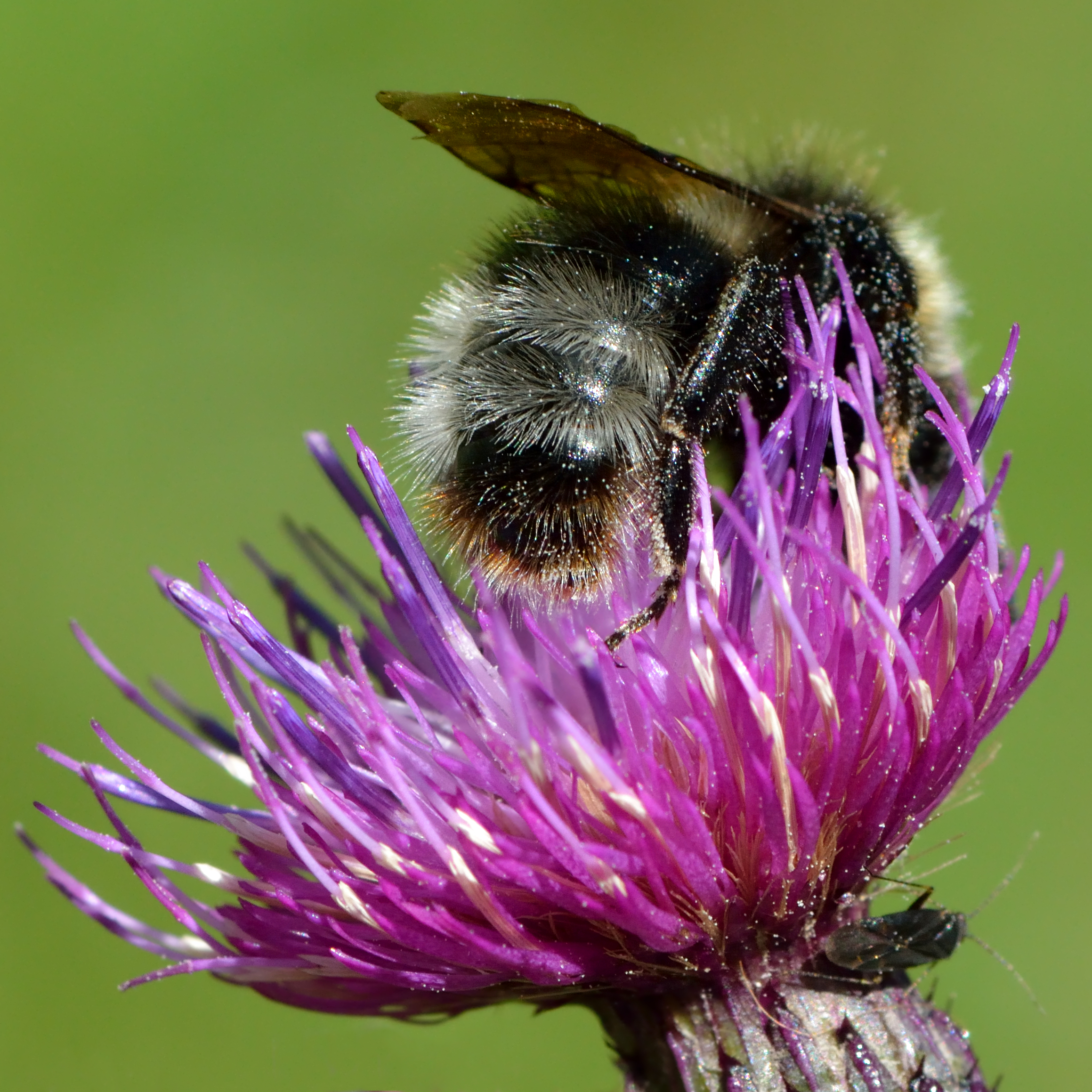
- Male

Conservation status
- Least Concern (IUCN 3.1)

Scientific classification
- Kingdom: Animalia
- Phylum: Arthropoda
- Class: Insecta
- Order: Hymenoptera
- Family: Apidae
- Genus: Bombus
- Subgenus: Psithyrus
- Species: B. sylvestris

Binomial name
- Bombus sylvestris (Le Peletier, 1832)

Synonyms
- Psithyrus sylvestris Le Peletier, 1833

= Bombus sylvestris =

Species of bee

Bombus sylvestris, known as the forest cuckoo bumblebee or four-coloured cuckoo bee, is a species of cuckoo bumblebee, found in most of Europe and Russia. Its main hosts are Bombus pratorum, Bombus jonellus, and Bombus monticola. As a cuckoo bumblebee, Bombus sylvestris lays its eggs in another bumblebee's nest. This type of bee leaves their young to the workers of another nest for rearing, allowing cuckoo bumblebees to invest minimal energy and resources in their young while still keeping the survival of their young intact.

== Taxonomy and phylogeny ==
Bombus sylvestris belongs to the order Hymenoptera. Specifically, the species falls under the family Apidae, which further subdivides into the subfamily Apinae, and then the tribe Bombini.

== Description and identification ==
This is a small bumblebee; the queen has a body length of 15 mm (0.59 in) and the male one of 14 mm (0.55 in). The head is round, and the proboscis is short. Its fur is black with a yellow collar and a white tail. Sometimes the bumblebee can have a few pale hairs on top of its head, its scutellum, and/or on its tergite (abdominal segment). The male is variably melanistic. Those rarely found in northern Scotland have an abdomen that is yellow instead of white.

=== Cuckoo bee vs. queen/worker bumblebees ===
The cuckoo bee has many physical differences from ordinary bumblebees. Cuckoo female bees do not have pollen baskets on their rear legs. Most cuckoo bumblebees also do not produce wax from between their abdominal segments, although there is evidence that the Bombus sylvestris bumblebee secretes wax.

Since B. sylvestris lacks the ability to excrete wax, it is neither capable of producing eggs cells that enclose their eggs, nor does it have the capacity to create honey pots from which newly emerged broods may feed upon. However, this serves well in the defense of cuckoo bees, as there are no weak points between the abdominal segments of the cuckoo bee for other bees to pierce through using their stingers. Moreover, cuckoo bumblees are slightly less hairy, have shorter tongues, have more pointed abdomens, and contain much sturdier bodies than normal bees.

== Distribution and habitat ==
The forest cuckoo bumblebee can be found throughout most of Europe from the northern half of the Iberian Peninsula to southern Italy, from Greece in the south to beyond the Arctic Circle in the north, and from Ireland in the west to the easternmost part of Russia. They are found throughout Britain, but are absent in sections of eastern Scotland, the Scilly Isles, and Shetland.

Most Bombus sylvestris can be found in post-industrial, mineral extraction sites and spoil heaps, gardens, parks, woodlands, and deciduous forests, which is why they get their nickname of the forest cuckoo bumblebee.

== Diet ==
The Forest cuckoo bee (Bombus sylvestris) can be found foraging on white deadnettler, globe thistle, white clover, buttercup, sallow, bramble, lavender, and viper's bugloss, along with other specimens.

== Colony cycle ==
Females will come out of hibernation a few weeks after its host species comes out of hibernation. The target host species is almost always Bombus pratorum, seen in studies by Hoffer in 1889 and Kupper & Schwammberger in 1995. The female selects her host nest by assessing the stage of development within that nest. Since bumblebee workers are solely responsible for rearing the imposter brood, the female cuckoo bee must select her host nest very carefully. Usually, the female cuckoo bee searches for a nest that has a few worker bees present, most likely because it shows that the nest can take care of her young. However, she must also ensure that there are not too many worker bees in case she is detected, attacked, and possibly killed along with her eggs. Hence, B. sylvestris is faced with the duty to find an optimal nest under a time restriction. If the nest she enters is well developed, then there is a chance that the worker bees will attack the parasitic B. sylvestris and kill her. However, if the target nest is too underdeveloped, then the female Forest cuckoo bee will be unable to rear a large brood. Once she does find her target host nest, she sneaks into the nest to take over the colony.

== Behavior ==
Since cuckoo bumblebees do not need to supply resources to their young, they do not tend to forage as aggressively or industriously as worker and queen bumblebees. Before entering a nest, cuckoo bumblebees bees tend to behave similar to male bumblebees—drinking nectar until full and then resting until hungry again.

=== Nest acquisition ===
Cuckoo female bumblebees usually use their smell to locate a nest. They tend to infiltrate the nest and sting the existing queen to death before laying their eggs. However, the female cuckoo bee may sneak into the nest, hide in for a couple of days to ensure she smells like the nest, and then lay her eggs without detection. As a parasitic relationship, this does not bode well for the nest because the cuckoo larvae impostors steal resources from the nest and energy from the worker bees, while contributing nothing to the nest.

=== Pollen collection ===
The Bombus sylvestris cuckoo female bee cannot collect pollen for her nest because it lacks corbicula, which are pollen baskets found on bumblebees on the hind legs. However, the Forest cuckoo bee does eat pollen like regular social bumblebees because the pollen helps in ovary maturation in fertilized females.

=== Worker rearing ===
Bombus sylvestris females are incapable of rearing any worker bees. The cuckoo bee only lays females identical to herself. Moreover, these offspring are unable to complete worker bee tasks that social bumblebees undertake normally, such as producing wax cells and gathering pollen.

== Interventionism of parasitic relationship ==
Human intervention is not needed, and is not condoned. B. sylvestris has evolved naturally alongside its target species, such as B. pratorum and B. jonellus., and presents the natural order of their existence. An alternative method to help bees is to ensure the bees have rich environments and habitats.

== Ecological summary ==
Since it is a cuckoo bumblebee, Bombus sylvestris does not construct its own nest; rather, it usurps the nests of other bumblebees. Its major host is Bombus pratorum, but Bombus jonellus and Bombus monticola are also visited. When patrolling for young queens with which to mate, the males fly in circuits about 1 m above ground, marking objects with their pheromones to attract the queens. The bumblebee often visits thistles and bramble. The queen also feeds on flowers such as sallow, deadnettles, dandelion, bay, horse chestnut, lavender, and others. The males, on the contrary, visits clovers, green alkanets, hound's-tongues, knapweeds, and many others.
