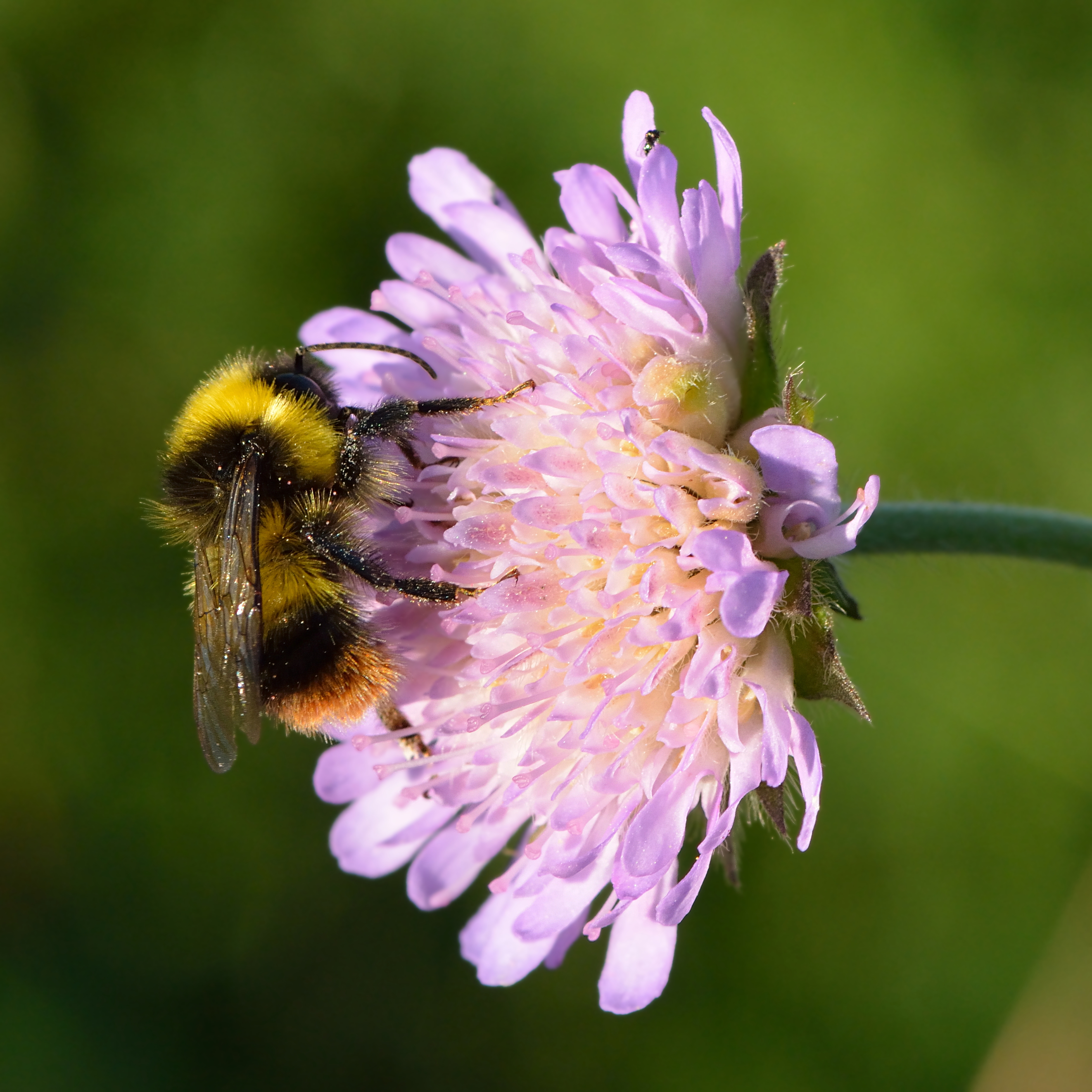
- B. pratorum pollinating

Conservation status
- Least Concern (IUCN 3.1)

Scientific classification
- Kingdom: Animalia
- Phylum: Arthropoda
- Clade: Pancrustacea
- Class: Insecta
- Order: Hymenoptera
- Family: Apidae
- Genus: Bombus
- Subgenus: Pyrobombus
- Species: B. pratorum

Binomial name
- Bombus pratorum (Linnaeus, 1761)

= Early bumblebee =

Species of bee

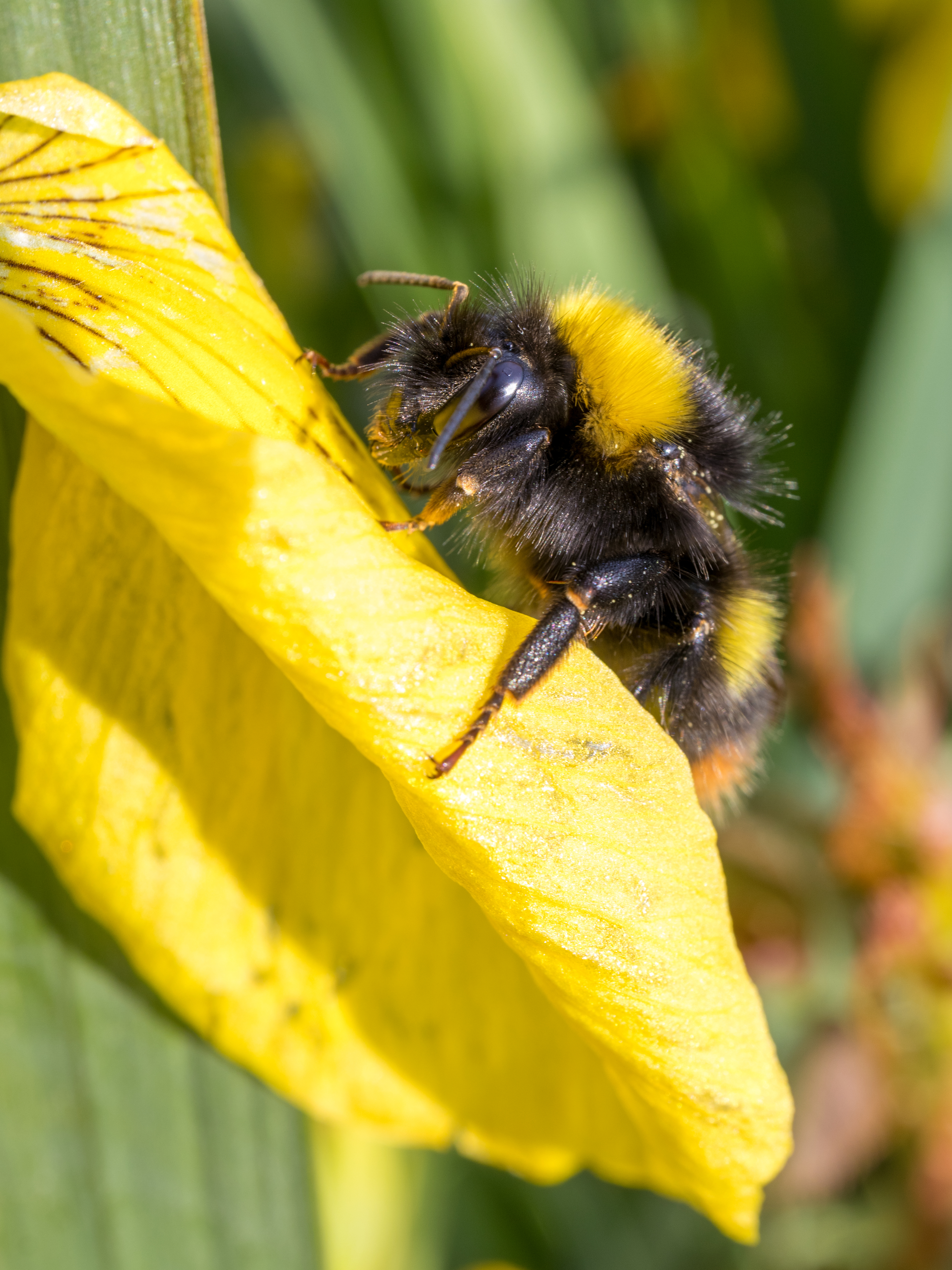

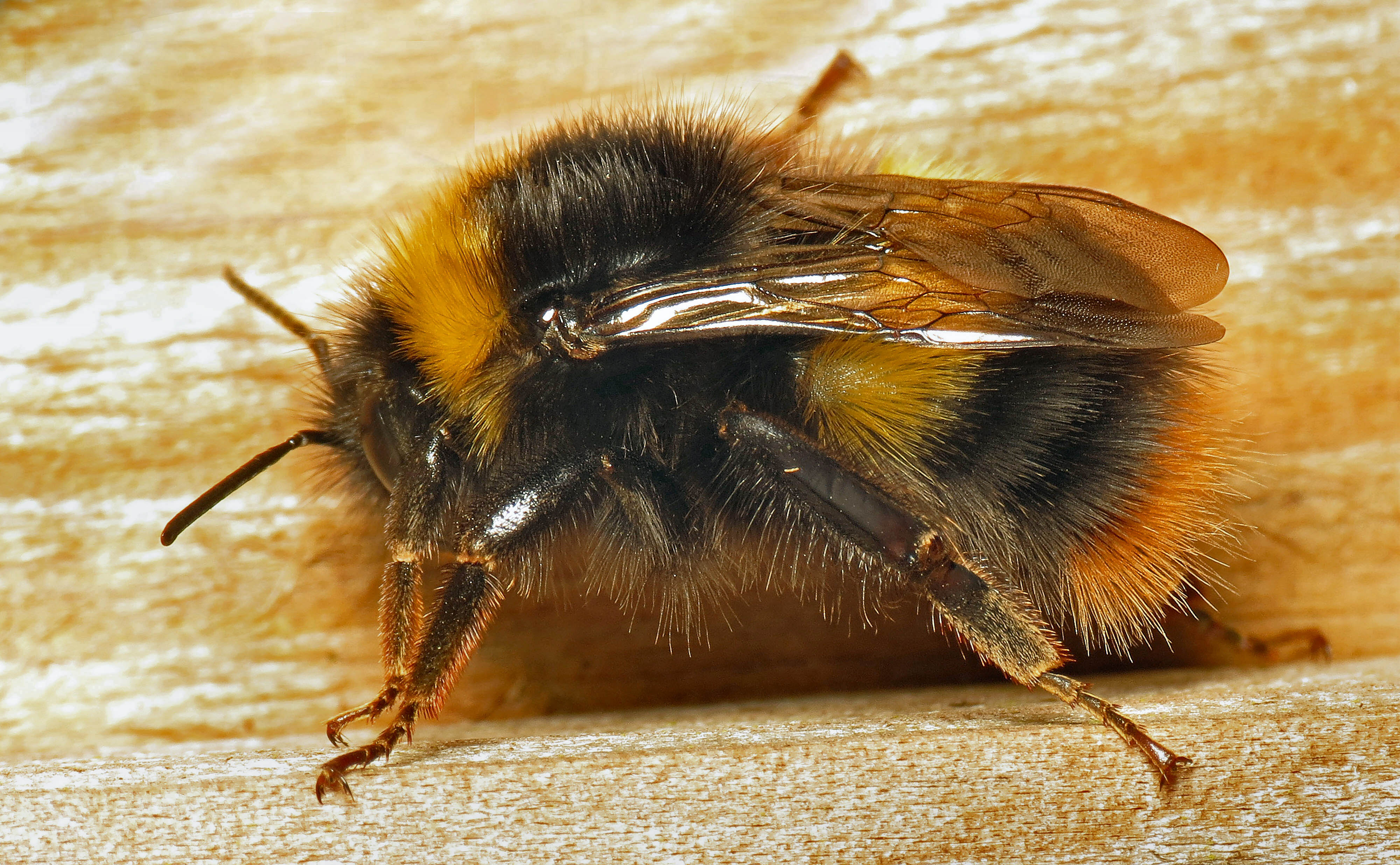

The early bumblebee or early-nesting bumblebee (Bombus pratorum) is a small bumblebee with a wide distribution in most of Europe and parts of Asia. It is very commonly found in the UK and emerges to begin its colony cycle as soon as February which is earlier than most other species, hence its common name. There is even some evidence that the early bumblebee may be able to go through two colony cycles in a year. Like other bumblebees, Bombus pratorum lives in colonies with queen and worker castes. Bombus pratorum queens use aggressive behavior rather than pheromones to maintain dominance over the workers.

== Description and identification ==
The queen is black with a yellow collar (the band around the front of the thorax), another yellow band on the first tergite (abdominal segment), and red colouration on the tail (terga 5 and 6). The male has a wider yellow collar, yellow colouration on both terga 1 and 2, and a red tail, also. The workers are similar to the queen, but often with less yellow colouration; usually the abdominal, yellow band is more or less missing. The head of the bumblebee is rounded, and the proboscis is short. The bumblebee is quite small; the queen has a body length of 15–17 mm (0.59–0.67 in), the worker 10–14 mm (0.39–0.55 in), and the male 11–13 mm (0.43–0.51 in).

Shortly after their emergence, workers can be distinguished by a silvery color before quickly changing to the normal colors of the foraging bees (a similar appearance to the queen with the middle yellow band missing).

== Taxonomy and phylogeny ==
The early bumblebee belongs to the genus Bombus and subgenus Pyrobombus. It shares many characteristics with other bees in the Bombus family, including its monandrous mating and pollen collecting. Also included in the Bombus family is Psithyrus, which had formerly been removed because of its parasitic nature but is now included. They are most closely related to stingless bees and are distinguished from other species by characteristics of male genitalia. B. pratorum are also classified as short-tongued bumblebees which differ in behaviour from long-tongued bumblebees. In particular, their short tongues may allow them to participate in nectar robbing.

== Distribution and habitat ==
B. pratorum is found in most of Europe, from the Arctic to the Mediterranean. It is, however, uncommon in the south of the Iberian Peninsula, Italy, and the Balkans. On the steppes of southern Russia and Ukraine, it is totally absent. In Asia, it is found in the mountains of northern Turkey, northern Iran, and uncommonly in Siberia west of the Yenisei River.

It is common in most of the mainland United Kingdom, but less so in north-west of Scotland. It is absent from most Scottish islands, Orkney, and Shetland.

Its preferred habitat is very wide-ranging, including fields, parks, scrubland, and sparse forest. B. pratorum build nests above ground, and especially in the UK, are known to utilize bird nests or abandoned rodent nests for their own nesting sites.

== Flight period ==
B. pratorum flies early (hence its name), usually from March to July, but in milder climates, as parts of southern England, it can appear as early as February. However, the large earth bumblebee is normally even earlier.

== Colony cycle ==
The early bumblebee has a yearly life cycle; however, some early bumblebees are able to go through two cycles in a year if young queens skip hibernation and start a colony sooner. Generally, queens emerge from hibernation in early spring having been fertilized in late summer and they find a site to begin their nest. Colonies for early bumblebees tend to be on the smaller side and reach their maximum numbers earlier in the year than other species.

== Behaviour ==
=== Division of labor ===
==== Queens ====
Queens are responsible for starting the new colony and finding a nest site. In bumblebees, queens are the only ones capable of producing more queens. They have a large store of food at the start of the colony cycle until workers and foragers are able to retrieve food and the queen can stay in the nest and continue to lay eggs. In the end, the queen does not survive but the young queens, who would emerge about a week after males emerge, continue the cycle for the next spring. These young queens leave the nest, only returning for shelter after they forage. They do not contribute to the nest and when they are ready to mate, the queen will fly to a site where a male has deposited a chemical attractant and waits to mate with them.

==== Workers ====
Some workers develop foraging abilities just days after they emerge which allows the queen to focus on laying her eggs. Some workers do not leave the nest to forage, however, and perform duties within the colony. These are generally the smaller of the bees and are usually characterized by weaker legs and wings because they rarely fly. They also have less worn coats. Workers cannot produce queens or produce other workers, but they can lay eggs that will develop into males.

==== Male behaviour ====
Emerging males can serve as an indicator that the cycle is coming to an end because they are not produced until late in the season, once stores in the nest have become sufficient. At first, they spend a short amount of time in the nest, during which time they do not work. They then consume the stores of food in the nest and then leave to go mate, never replenishing the stores and allowing them to be depleted. Because of this, workers die out and the already aged queen who has probably lost influence over her workers eventually dies out as well. Males do not return to the nest and instead can be seen seeking shelter or protection by staying underneath flowers.

=== Worker-Queen conflict ===
==== Egg laying ====
While workers cannot produce other workers or queens, the unfertilized eggs that they lay can become males. At around the same time that the queen begins to lay eggs that will develop into males, the workers' ovaries, those "house bees" who stay in the nest, begin to develop. As workers try to lay eggs of their own, there is increased aggression among workers and among workers and queens. These workers may even try to eat the eggs laid by the queen and if they are persistent enough, will be successful in laying eggs of their own.

==== Worker Policing ====
Queens do not use pheromones to control their workers. Instead, they exhibit aggressive behaviour such as opening her mandibles to headbutt the most dominant of the worker bees in order to maintain her dominance and have control of the colony.

=== Mating ===
B. pratorum mate infrequently and do not exhibit polyandry. It was hypothesized that because Bombus bees are parasitized they may have developed polyandry, but this is not the case. Instead they mate singly with a low mating frequency. B. pratorum do not appear to require multiple matings to produce enough sperm to fertilize eggs because as it is, only a couple hundred of the workers contribute sperm anyway. At the end of the colony cycle there is not much reduction in sperm left over in the queen's spermatheca, suggesting that she has enough.

=== Hibernation ===
Since bumblebees have an annual colony cycle, only the young queens survive and go on to start a new colony after the other members of the nest have died out. The young queens that are produced go into hibernation before the next cycle. Since early bumblebees produce queens so early, they enter hibernation earlier than other species. Before hibernation, queens store up fat deposits and sugar. Usually the queens are fertilized as well, but this does not necessarily have to be the case. Queens also fill their crop with honey before entering hibernation.

B. pratorum tend to hibernate just below the soil near trees and emerge early in the spring. At such shallow depths, they may be more susceptible to temperature changes which could be related to their early emergence in the spring.

== Interaction with other species ==
=== Diet ===
B. Pratorum are good pollinators of flowers and fruits. It feeds on flowering plants with short corollae, as white clover, thistles, sage, lavender, Asteraceae, cotoneaster, and Allium. B. pratorum are a bit more selective in the flowers that they pollinate in comparison with other bumblebees, visiting fabaceae plants almost exclusively. This may be due to the fact that, although they emerge early, they have a short colony cycle and in this limited time they need to be able to provide high quality food. Early bumblebees are less selective when it comes to nectar collection.

=== Parasitism ===
Many bees of the Bombus species, including B. pratorum, are parasitized by bees of the Psithyrus species. Bombus sylvestris in particular are cuckoo parasites who tend to not show much aggression at the start of the colony cycle until competition begins. In fact, during this phase they will not be aggressive if not attacked. Mauling is not an important behaviour to usurping the nest, but these bees do exhibit a head rubbing behaviour in which they follow bees throughout the comb. It is unclear the exact purpose of this behaviour, but it is suspected to be a way of communicating via pheromones. While both Bombus and Psithyrus species can have success in a colony, there is still aggressive behaviour displayed by Psithyrus. Eggs that are laid before the parasites are introduced to the colony are reared. After some time, however, Psithyrus bees do begin destroying egg batches, eating eggs, and destroying larvae.
