= List of amphibians of Great Britain =

This is a list of amphibians of Great Britain. There are seven extant amphibian species native to Great Britain, in addition, there are a number of naturalized species and extirpated/extinct species. Native is taken to mean a species which arrived in Britain by its own agency and became resident during the Holocene, as defined by the UK nature watchdog, Natural England. For amphibians, this means colonising through Doggerland (the dry North Sea), prior to marine inundation, to the landmass that would become Britain at the end of the Last Ice Age. The extant natives comprise three newts, two toads and two frogs. In addition, there are at least a further two species of lost native amphibian, which became extinct prior to 1800 AD. Therefore, including the pool frog, Britain has historically lost 30% of all amphibian species. Creating a complete list of native species can be challenging due to the paucity and interpretation of limited archeological/subfossil evidence.

== Extant native species ==
=== Pleurodelinae ===
Adult	Name	Larva
	Great crested newt (Triturus cristatus)	
	Smooth newt (Lissotriton vulgaris)	
	Palmate newt (Lissotriton helveticus)	

=== Bufonidae ===
Adult	Name	Tadpole
	Common toad (Bufo bufo)	
	Natterjack toad (Epidalea calamita)	

=== Ranidae ===
Adult	Name	Tadpole / froglet
	Common frog (Rana temporaria)	
Rana_arvalis.2006-04-23.uellue	Northern pool frog (Pelophylax lessonae)	

== Extirpated species ==
- Moor frog (Rana arvalis) — Extinct prior to 1800 AD (or perhaps later) due to wetland drainage and destruction of peat bogs for fuel use.
- Agile frog (Rana dalmatina) — Became extinct prior to 1800 AD due to woodland clearance and drainage. It may have survived into the Industrial Period.
- European tree frog (Hyla arborea) — Became extinct in initially around 1700 AD due to overcollection for medicinal use. It is unclear as to whether the original population is of natural or human descent.

There is an expressed monetary momentum and interest to investigate whether the reintroduction some or all of these lost amphibians could be undertaken in the future, as part of stringent feasibility studies. This would require consent from Government bodies, only granted if the proposals do not threaten existing wildlife (including disease risk), habitats and livelyhoods.

== Naturalised and invasive species ==
- Salamanders and newts
  - Fire salamander (Salamandra salamandra)
  - Alpine newt (Ichthyosaura alpestris) — invasive
  - Italian crested newt (Triturus carnifex)
- Frogs, toads and allies
  - Midwife toad (Alytes obstetricans) — naturalised (possibly native)
  - Yellow-bellied toad (Bombina variegata) — was naturalised current status unknown - likely restricted to Devon if still present.
  - Painted frog (Discoglossus pictus) — has bred at least once
  - Australian green tree frog (Litoria caerulea) — has bred at least once
  - Marsh frog (Pelophylax ridibundus) — invasive
  - Edible frog (Pelophylax kl. esculentus) — invasive
  - Iberian water frog (Pelophylax perezi) – invasive at RSPB Ham wall nature reserve
  - American bullfrog (Lithobates catesbeiana) — successfully bred - considered invasive
  - African clawed toad (Xenopus laevis) — two invasive populations survived in the UK for 50 years, now extinct apart from in Calderstones Park.
