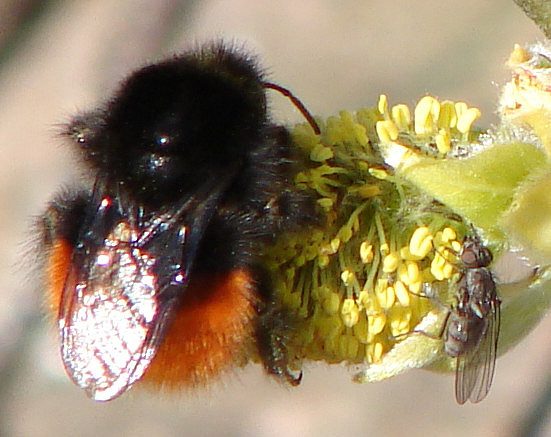

Scientific classification
- Kingdom: Animalia
- Phylum: Arthropoda
- Clade: Pancrustacea
- Class: Insecta
- Order: Hymenoptera
- Family: Apidae
- Genus: Bombus
- Subgenus: Pyrobombus
- Species: B. monticola

Binomial name
- Bombus monticola Smith, 1849

= Bombus monticola =

Species of bee

Bombus monticola, the bilberry bumblebee, blaeberry bumblebee or mountain bumblebee, is a species of bumblebee found in Europe.

== Description ==
The bilberry bumblebee is rather small and compact, with a broad head and a short tongue. The queens have an average length of 16 mm (0.63 in), and a wingspan of 32 mm (1.3 in). The corresponding lengths of the other castes are 12 mm (0.47 in) (worker) and 14 mm (0.55 in) (male). In the nominate subspecies, the thorax is black, with the exception of a yellow collar (quite broad on the males) and on the edge of the scutellum. The first, and the frontal part of the second terga (abdominal segments) are black, as is the final tergite, but the rest of the abdomen is yellow to red.

== Ecology ==
The bumblebee is normally a highland species, often found on bilberry, cranberry, and cowberry (Vaccinium vitis-idaea). It is a pollen storer; it actively feeds the larvae from a central pollen storage, rather than providing each larval cell with its own pollen container. It nests underground in the abandoned nesting burrows of small mammals, the relatively small nests frequently house less than 50 workers and their life cycle is 3–4 months. In Great Britain the queens emerge from their hibernation during April; the first workers appear in May, and the males and new queens start to emerge in July and last until early October. The cuckoo bumblebee Bombus sylvestris is likely to be parasitic on this species.

== Taxonomy ==
This species is closely related to Bombus lapponicus but has a more eastern distribution; a number of subspecies are recognised:

- B. m. monticola, the nominate subspecies, is rather darkly coloured and present on the British Islands.
- B. m. scandinavicus, the Scandinavian subspecies, is also a more or less dark form.
- B. m. alpestris is a subspecies present in the Alps and the Balkans.
- B. m. rondoui lives in the Cantabrian Mountains and the Pyrenees.
- B. m. konradini, living in the Apennines, is a light subspecies with a striking pattern; the thorax is almost zebra-striped in white, black and white.

== Distribution ==
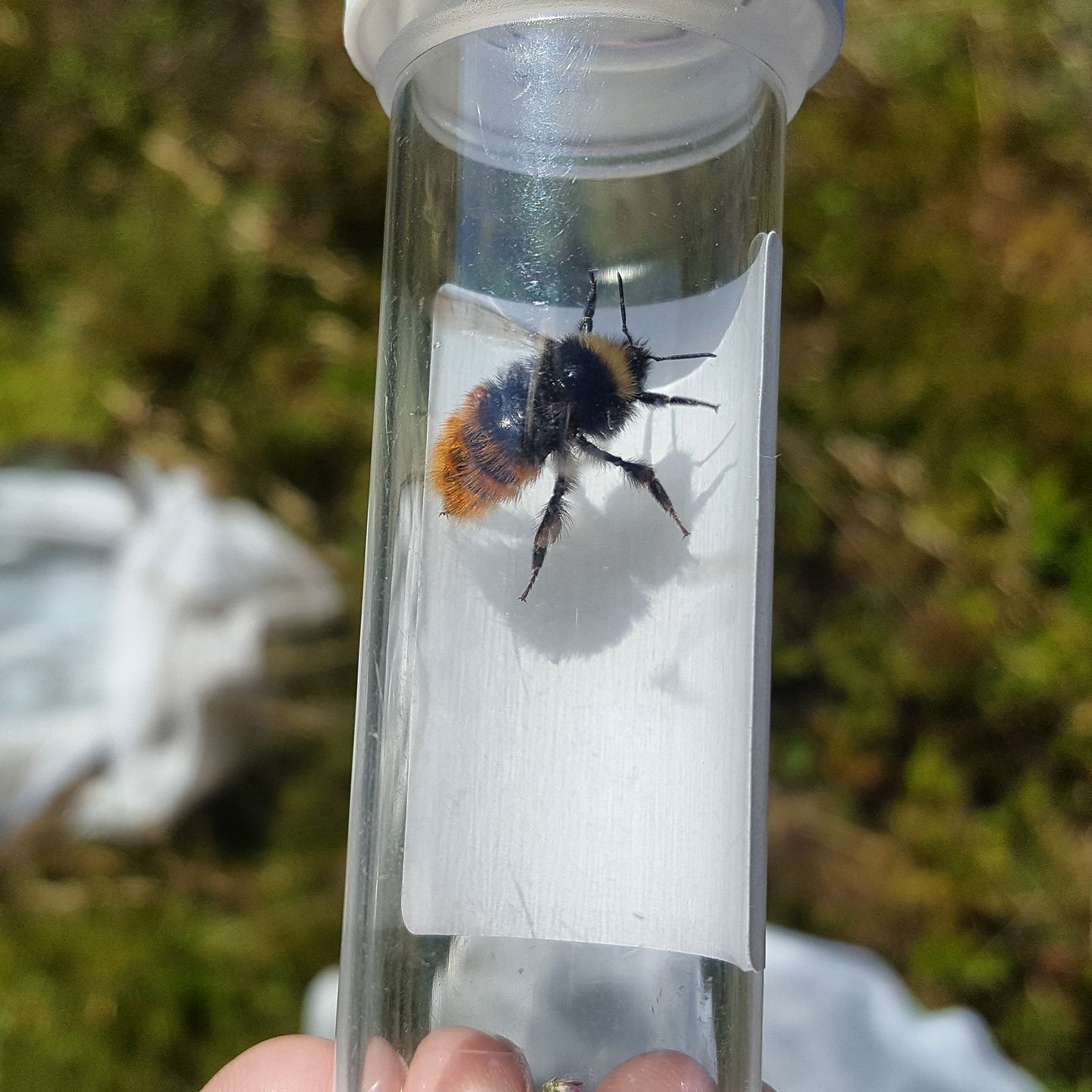
Bilberry Bumblebee, in sample tube for identification purposes.

B. monticola is found in most mountainous areas of Europe, as northern Scandinavia (mostly Norway and northern Sweden; the distribution in Finland is rather patchy, and confined to the area along the Norwegian border), the Alps, the Cantabrian Mountains, the Pyrenees, the Apennines, and in the Balkans. It is also found in the lowlands in northern Norway and the Kola peninsula as on the British Islands. In Britain, it lives on upland habitat, predominantly moorland. The major areas populated by this bumblebee are Dartmoor, Exmoor, the Welsh uplands, the Peak District, the North York Moors, and the Scottish mainland.

It is a recent arrival in Ireland (first recorded in the 1970s). In Ireland, it is a montane species (hence the name). It is restricted to upland areas of counties Antrim, Dublin, Wicklow, Carlow and Wexford. The decline of this species in England has led Natural England to include the bilberry bumble bee in its Species recovery Programme.
