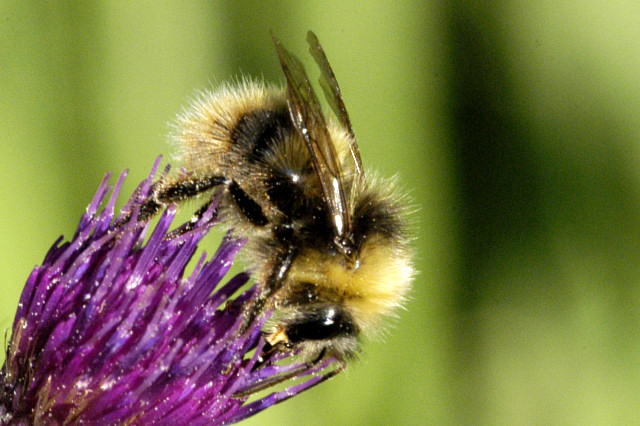

Scientific classification
- Kingdom: Animalia
- Phylum: Arthropoda
- Clade: Pancrustacea
- Class: Insecta
- Order: Hymenoptera
- Family: Apidae
- Genus: Bombus
- Subgenus: Pyrobombus
- Species: B. jonellus

Binomial name
- Bombus jonellus (Kirby, 1802)

= Bombus jonellus =

Species of bee

The heath humble-bee or small heath bumblebee, Bombus jonellus, is a species of bumblebee, widely distributed in Europe and northern Asia, as well as northern North America.

== Description ==
A fairly small bumblebee, it has body lengths around 16 mm (0.63 in) (queen) and 12 mm (0.47 in) (worker and male). The queen has an average wingspan of 29 mm (1.1 in). The face and proboscis are short. Females (queens and workers) have a predominantly black abdomen with a yellow collar, the first and sometimes second terga yellow, and a white tail. The face is black, occasionally with a patch of yellow fur on the top. Males are similar, but with more yellow; the yellow collar continues on the ventral side, the two first terga are always yellow, and much more yellow fur is found on the face. However, darker forms of the females are seen, as well as forms (sometimes considered subspecies) that differ in the amount of yellow in the fur, and with brownish hairs on the white tail. Among these are B. j. hebridensis (which is endemic to the Hebridean islands of Scotland), B. j. monapiae, and B. j. vogtii. On the Orkney and the Hebrides, a form exists where the males have red tails instead of white.

== Ecology ==
The heath humble-bee is found in gardens and meadows, as well as on heath and moorland. The bumblebee visits various food sources, such as clover, bird's-foot trefoil, cowberry, thistles, and many others.

The nest, which at most can contain 50 to 120 workers, can be situated both above and under ground. When the climate permits, as in southern England, this species can have two broods a season. A study in northern Sweden shows the males, when patrolling for young queens, do so at tree-top level, marking twigs and leaves with pheromones to attract the queens.

== Distribution ==
B. jonellus is present in most of Europe and a large part of northern Asia. In the west, it is common from Iceland, where it is the only native species of bumblebee, to the Cantabrian Mountains in northern Spain. It is found beyond the Arctic Circle in Scandinavia and Russia, where it is continuously distributed north of 55ºN and more unevenly distributed to the south. In southern Europe, the distribution, too, is patchy, and restricted to the mountains. In Asia, it reaches the Gulf of Anadyr on the Pacific. In United Kingdom, it is common in the south-east, in East Anglia, northern Scotland including the Hebrides, Orkney, and Shetland. It is also found in Canada east to Hudson Bay and Alaska.
