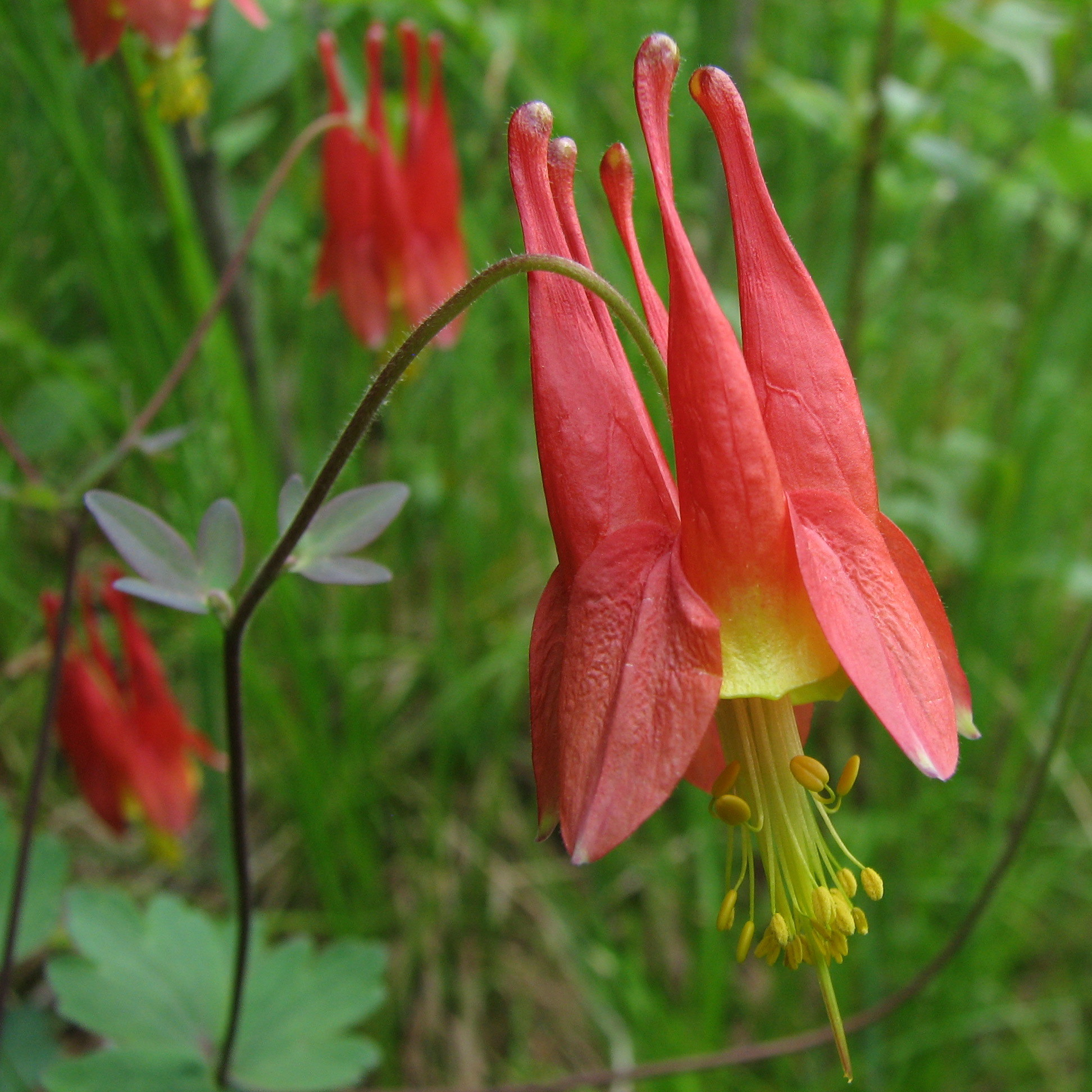

Conservation status
- Secure (NatureServe)

Scientific classification
- Kingdom: Plantae
- Clade: Tracheophytes
- Clade: Angiosperms
- Clade: Eudicots
- Order: Ranunculales
- Family: Ranunculaceae
- Genus: Aquilegia
- Species: A. canadensis

Binomial name
- Aquilegia canadensis L.

Synonyms
- List: Aquilegia australis Small; Aquilegia canadensis f. albiflora House; Aquilegia canadensis subsp. americana Rapaics; Aquilegia canadensis var. aurea Opret; Aquilegia canadensis var. australis (Small) Munz; Aquilegia canadensis var. coccinea (Small) Munz; Aquilegia canadensis f. ecalcarata Livingston; Aquilegia canadensis var. eminens (Greene) B.Boivin; Aquilegia canadensis var. flaviflora (Tenney) Britton; Aquilegia canadensis f. flaviflora (Tenney) Britton ex House; Aquilegia canadensis f. flaviflora (Tenney) Britton; Aquilegia canadensis f. gartneri Rapaics; Aquilegia canadensis var. hybrida Hook.; Aquilegia canadensis var. latiuscula (Greene) Munz; Aquilegia canadensis var. longistyla Regel; Aquilegia canadensis var. phippenii J.Rob.; Aquilegia canadensis f. phippenii (J.Rob.) Ralph Hoffm.; Aquilegia canadensis var. vera Brühl; Aquilegia canadensis var. violacea Nutt.; Aquilegia coccinea Small; Aquilegia elegans Salisb.; Aquilegia eminens Greene; Aquilegia flaviflora Tenney; Aquilegia latiuscula Greene; Aquilegia phoenicantha Cory; Aquilegia variegata Moench

= Aquilegia canadensis =

Species of flowering plant

Aquilegia canadensis, the Canadian columbine, Canada columbine, eastern red columbine, or wild columbine, is a species of flowering plant in the buttercup family. It is a perennial plant that is native to the woodlands and rocky areas in eastern North America in both the United States and southern Canada. It readily hybridizes with other plants in the columbine genus and is a common garden plant.

== Description ==
Canadian columbine is an herbaceous perennial growing 15–90 centimeters (6–35 in) tall in the wild, occasionally reaching as much as 1 m (3.3 ft). It produces its stems and leaves from a substantial caudex, a vertically oriented underground stem. Its roots are short-lived and fibrous. The hollow stems are often entirely hairless, but can have very fine, short, and erect glandular hairs on the upper parts or covering the whole stem.

The leaves are two times ternately compound, each leaf divided into three parts with three leaflets, nine in total, though older sources report that they can have three ternate leaves. Leaves attached to the stems are smaller than the basal leaves, those springing directly from the caudex. Basal leaves are much shorter than the flowering stems, reaching lengths of 7 to 30 cm (3–12 in), though more typically 10 to 20 cm (3.9–7.9 in) including the main petiole.

The leaflets of Canadian columbine are broadly ovate, egg shaped in outline, to almost round, but with wavy teeth or lobes. The surface of the leafletes are always hairless, but the underside can be covered in very fine and short hairs giving a pale appearance. The leaves are green to blue-green, and remains evergreen at temperatures down to −23 °C (−10 °F) and as high as 43 °C (110 °F). At these extremes the plant goes dormant and sprouts new leaves when favorable conditions return.

Canadian columbines start blooming in spring, as early as March in their native habitat, or as late as July in early summer. Flowering continues for about one month, dependent on weather conditions. A typical flower has five petals yellow at opening that elongate into red, nectar-bearing spurs and alternate with five red, petal like sepals. However, flowers can have four or six petals and a matching number of sepals. Rarely, flowers in the wild can be entirely salmon, yellow, or white. The flowers are nodding, hanging downwards with the spurs pointing up and the many stamens projecting downwards together. The flowers are showy and measure 2 to 5 cm (0.8 to 2.0 in) from the ends of the stamens to the tips of the spurs. Petals measure 2 to 3.6 cm (0.8 to 1.4 in) from end of the spur to the outer edge.

The anthers on the stamens open to release their pollen before the stigmas becomes receptive to aid cross pollination by visitors to the flowers. The flowers produce abundant dilute nectar, and attract hummingbirds, bumblebees, hawkmoths, and other bees. The ruby-throated hummingbird (Archilochus colubris) is the primary pollinator.

After pollination, Canadian columbines produce an upright cluster of five pod-shaped follicles 1.5–3 cm (0.6–1.2 in) long, which taper into a long, slender beak. When mature, the follicles split along one side to release numerous small shiny, black seeds, 1.5–2 millimeters by 0.5–1 mm. Seeds develop rapidly, reaching maturity around two weeks after flowering.

Plants typically flower in their second year, and natural reseeding allows colonies to persist, despite individual plants having a short lifespan. Plants are shorter lived when growing in rich soils.

== Taxonomy ==
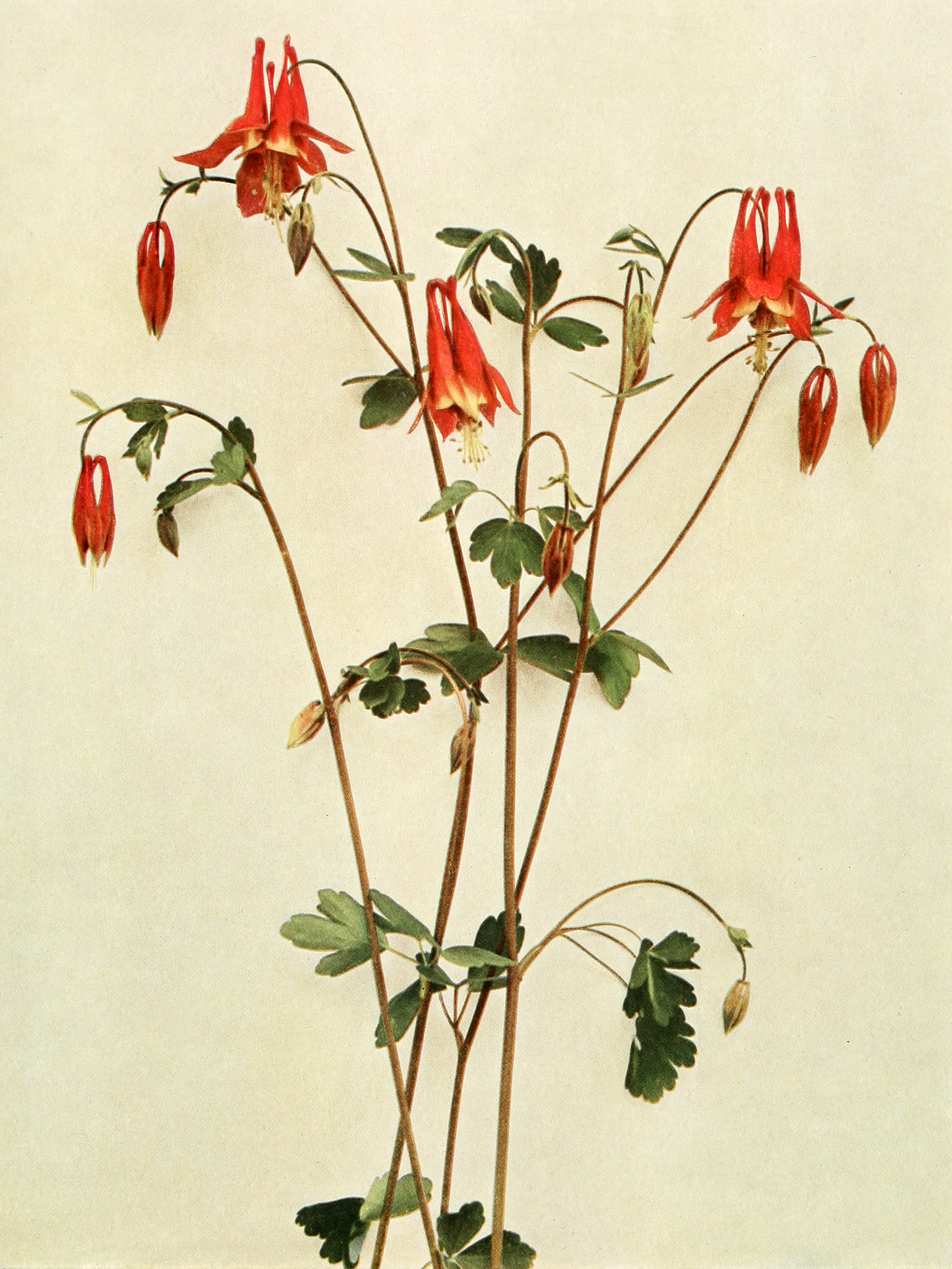
Illustration from Wild Flowers of New York, 1918

Aquilegia canadensis was given its binomial name by Carl Linnaeus in 1753. It is classified in the genus Aquilegia within the Ranunculaceae family. It has no accepted varieties, but has 11 among its 26 heterotypic synonyms.

Table of Synonyms
Name	Year	Rank	Notes
Aquilegia australis Small	1898	species	
Aquilegia canadensis subsp. americana Rapaics	1909	subspecies	
Aquilegia canadensis var. aurea Opret	1889	variety	nom. illeg.
Aquilegia canadensis var. australis (Small) Munz	1946	variety	
Aquilegia canadensis var. coccinea (Small) Munz	1946	variety	
Aquilegia canadensis var. eminens (Greene) B.Boivin	1953	variety	
Aquilegia canadensis var. flaviflora (Tenney) Britton	1888	variety	
Aquilegia canadensis var. hybrida Hook.	1829	variety	
Aquilegia canadensis var. latiuscula (Greene) Munz	1946	variety	
Aquilegia canadensis var. longistyla Regel	1867	variety	
Aquilegia canadensis var. phippenii J.Rob.	1888	variety	
Aquilegia canadensis var. vera Brühl	1893	variety	
Aquilegia canadensis var. violacea Nutt.	1838	variety	
Aquilegia coccinea Small	1899	species	
Aquilegia elegans Salisb.	1796	species	
Aquilegia eminens Greene	1914	species	
Aquilegia flaviflora Tenney	1868	species	
Aquilegia latiuscula Greene	1914	species	
Aquilegia phoenicantha Cory	1936	species	
Aquilegia variegata Moench	1794	species	

=== Names ===
The species name, canadensis, is Botanical Latin meaning "belonging to Canada", a reference to where the first scientific specimens were gathered. The common names Canadian columbine or Canada columbine are often used for this species. It is known by the name common columbine for its abundance throughout much of its native range. It is also called red columbine, however this name is used for other species including Aquilegia elegantula. It is additionally known as eastern columbine, eastern red columbine, wild red columbine, wild columbine, American columbine, and rock bells.

Among children the species was called honeysuckle because they would bite off the end of the spurs for the sweet nectar inside, it was most often used in Illinois, Massachusetts, and Wisconsin alongside the name honey horns. Other regional names include meetinghouses from New England, jacket-and-breeches, Jack-in-trousers, and lady's slipper in Massachusetts, red-bells and rock-lily from New Hampshire, and simply bells in Ohio. The names akeley and culverwort in English and ancolie or Gants de Notre-Dame in French are from Quebec while the name cluckies comes from Nova Scotia. Like other species in the genus it is also simply called columbine.

In the Omaha–Ponca language Aquilegia canadensis is called inubthoⁿ-kithe-sabe-hi, translating to "black perfume plant", related to one of its uses. In the Pawnee language it is known as skalikatit or as skarikatit meaning "black seed".

== Distribution and habitat ==
Aquilegia canadensis is a native to eastern and central North America, from New Brunswick to northern Florida and west to Saskatchewan and Texas. It is the sole native columbine from eastern North America, though smallflower columbine (Aquilegia brevistyla) is reported as far east as Clay County, Minnesota and northern parts of Ontario and the non-native European columbine (Aquilegia vulgaris) has escaped from cultivation in Canada, the northeast, and parts of the south.

In Canada it is native, but possibly locally extinct, in the eastern province of New Brunswick. In Quebec it is found in the areas near the St. Lawrence River, but not in the northern or eastern parts of the province. Similarly it is found throughout Southern Ontario, but only in the southern half of Northern Ontario to the west. It also grows in southern Manitoba, but only in the easternmost part of southern Saskatchewan.

In the Midwestern United States Canadian columbine is native to every state, but reaches its western limits in the Dakotas, Nebraska, Kansas, and Oklahoma. Its range extends almost to Wyoming in northern Nebraska, but is otherwise only in the easternmost portions of these states. Though native to Iowa, much of the central part of the state has no record of the species. In Missouri it is found throughout the state except for small areas of the southwest near Kansas and the southeastern lowlands. It is widespread in Minnesota, Wisconsin, and Illinois as well as Indiana, Michigan, and Ohio.

In the Northeastern United States it is recorded in every state from Maine to New Jersey, with records of the species in every county of Pennsylvania. In the Southeastern United States it is native to every state except for Louisiana. However, it is only common in northern parts of the south such as Virginia, West Virginia, and Kentucky. It becomes much less widespread in North Carolina and Tennessee and is only known from a few counties in South Carolina, Georgia, and Alabama. It only grows in the Florida panhandle and is only found in Tishomingo County, Mississippi. Likewise it mostly grows in northern parts of Arkansas. The population in Texas is disjunct from the rest of the range, growing only on the Edwards Plateau.

A. canadensis typically inhabits woodlands, forest edges, rocky slopes, and shaded bluffs. It will prefer well-drained, sandy or rocky soil, and will thrive in an area that experiences light to moderate shade. A. canadensis is best suited for sites that are not waterlogged or overly nutrient-rich. Due to its ability to both self and sexually reproduce, A. canadensis can maintain stable populations across a wide range of habitats.

== Ecology ==
=== Reproduction ===
Aquilegia canadensis has a mixed mating system, where they are able to both self-pollinate and outcross. The species is fully self-compatible, and has the ability to produce seeds without a pollinator. However, despite being self-compatible, it does not fully compensate for the absence of pollinators, since fruit and seed production is lowered when pollinators are not present.

One major factor that influences the selfing and outcrossing balance is the herkogamy of the anther and stigma. There is genetic variation in the separation of the reproductive structures between different populations, and plants that have greater separation between the anther and stigma have lower rates of autonomous selfing and are more prone to outcrossing. The separation is primarily due to differences in the pistil length, rather than positioning of the structures. The genetic difference in herkogamy between populations suggests that it can evolve through selection to regulate mating strategies.

Pollination is primarily carried out through the Ruby-Throated Hummingbird (Archilochus colubris), which is able to access the nectar stored in the elongated spurs of the flower. The Canadian columbine is one of the eight most important nectar sources for hummingbirds in eastern North America. In addition, bumblebees, hawk moths, and other bees also contribute to outcrossing between flowers. Genetic studies between A. canadensis and its sister species, A. brevistyla, which is primarily bee-pollinated, have shown that the shift to hummingbird pollination is associated with changes to spur curvature, floral pigmentation, and nectar traits.

Reproductive success is also reliant on the size of the population. Plants that grow in larger and more densely populated sites produce significantly more fruits and seeds per plant, in comparison to plants in smaller populations. Spatial isolation by itself does not have a large effect on reproductive output, but smaller population sizes reduces the opportunities for pollinator visits and outcrossing.

The rusty patched bumblebee (Bombus affinis) has been documented cutting holes in the spurs to engage in nectar robbing. Both queens and workers of the rusty patched bumblebee cut holes in the spurs, with some queens collecting pollen before cutting holes to take nectar. Workers either collected pollen or engaged in nectar robbing, not both behaviors at the same flower. Workers and queens both sometimes acquired nectar at the mouth of the flower rather than nectar robbing. Though other species have not been recorded making holes in the nectar spurs, the golden northern bumble bee (Bombus fervidus) do sometimes make use of holes that have already been made as well as collecting nectar from the mouth of the flower. Both honeybees and Lasioglossum sweat bees also use previously created perforations. Many other species of bumblebee collect nectar from Canadian columbine including the two-spotted bumble bee, brown-belted bumblebee, common eastern bumblebee, Nevada bumblebee, and American bumblebee. The half-black bumblebee both collects nectar and pollen from the flowers.

=== Disease and herbivory ===
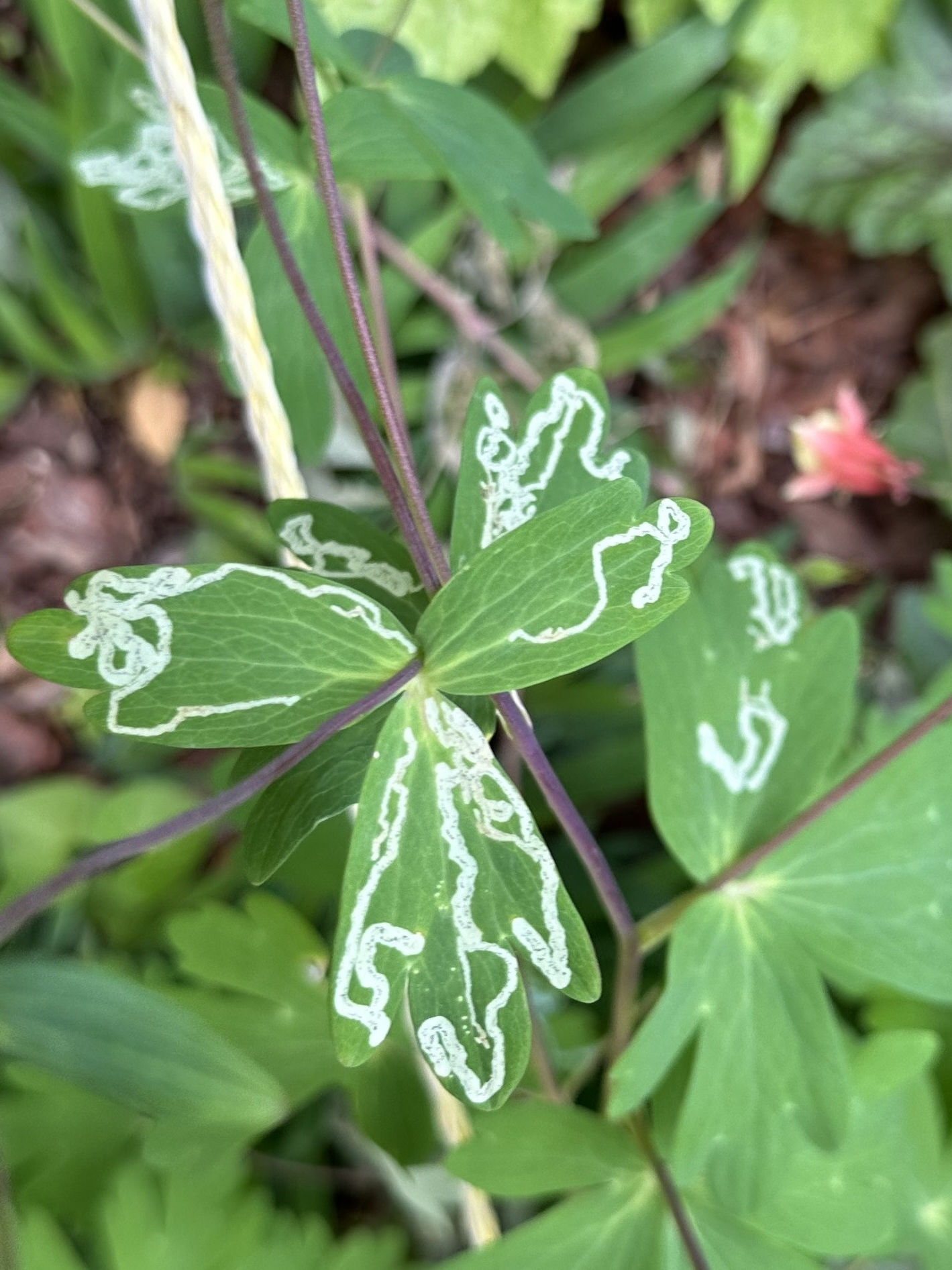
Leaf miner damage to an A. canadensis leaf

Aquilegia canadensis does not generally experience high rates of disease or herbivory in its native range. The most common issue is caused by leaf miner activity, as they create serpentine trail in the leaves, but is not major problem with the damage caused is generally only cosmetic. It is a host plant for the columbine duskywing butterfly (Erynnis lucilius) and the columbine borer moth (Papaipema leucostigma). It is also fed upon by the non-native columbine sawfly (Pristiphora rufipes), which can rapidly reduce leaves to just their veins. However, A. canadensis is resistant to deer and rabbit browsing. A. canadensis has a chemical defense system. When plant tissues are damaged it releases hydrogen cyanide (HCN).

== Cultivation ==
Aquilegia canadensis is a highly decorative plant, valued for its attractive foliage and showy flowers. For this reason it is widely grown outside its native region, in temperate regions of the Northern Hemisphere.

The plant grows best in light to moderate shade, and prefers well-drained sandy loams, thriving in limestone-based or circumneutral soils. Plants grown in soils that are too moist or rich may produce weak plants, and have a shorter lifespan. Despite being a short-lived perennial, it self seeds very readily, allowing it to persist for many years. Seedlings generally flower in their second year. Cool-moist stratification at 5 °C (41 °F) for three to four weeks may speed sprouting, but it is not required for germination. Mature plants are able to tolerate periods of drought, but growth is best under consistent moisture. Seeds can be stored for three to four months in seedbags at 5 to 6 °C (41–43 °F).

Several cultivars are commonly grown, including 'Corbett', a dwarf form with yellow flowers; 'Nana', which only produces all-yellow flowers; and 'Pink Lanterns', which has pink and white blossoms.

== In culture ==
Aquilegia canadensis has been used in several cultures across North America. In several Native American communities, seeds are crushed and rubbed on the hands to act as a love charm. The species is cultivated in gardens for its ornamental value, as its flowers and ability to thrive in shade have made it a popular feature in gardens. Several cultivars are commonly grown for their features, including their distinct flower color and size.

A traditional use by the Omaha and Ponca is to produce a perfume. The black seeds of the plant are gathered and crushed, often being chewed by the Omaha. The resulting paste would be spread on items of clothing and the fragrance would retained for a long time, often being more noticeable when clothing became damp with rain or dew. In the traditions of Pawnee people the seed is used to produce a perfume that is also reputed to act as a love charm. In Pawnee traditional medicine it is a reputed cure for fever or headache if the seeds were crushed to powder in a mortar and pestle made of elm-wood and then made into a drink in hot water. In the traditional medicine of the Cherokee a tea is made from Canadian columbine for "heart trouble".

== Gallery ==
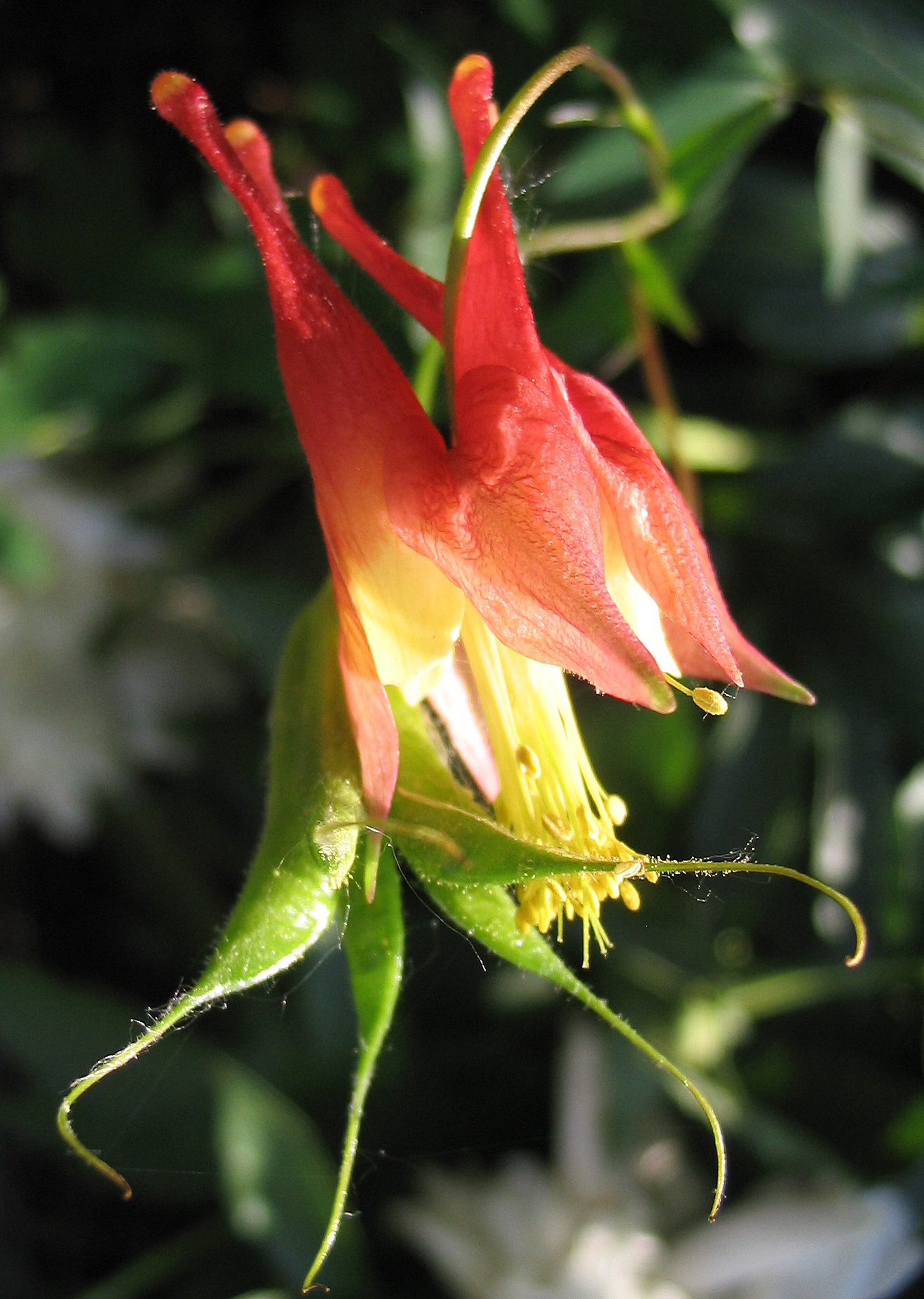
Flower and seedpod

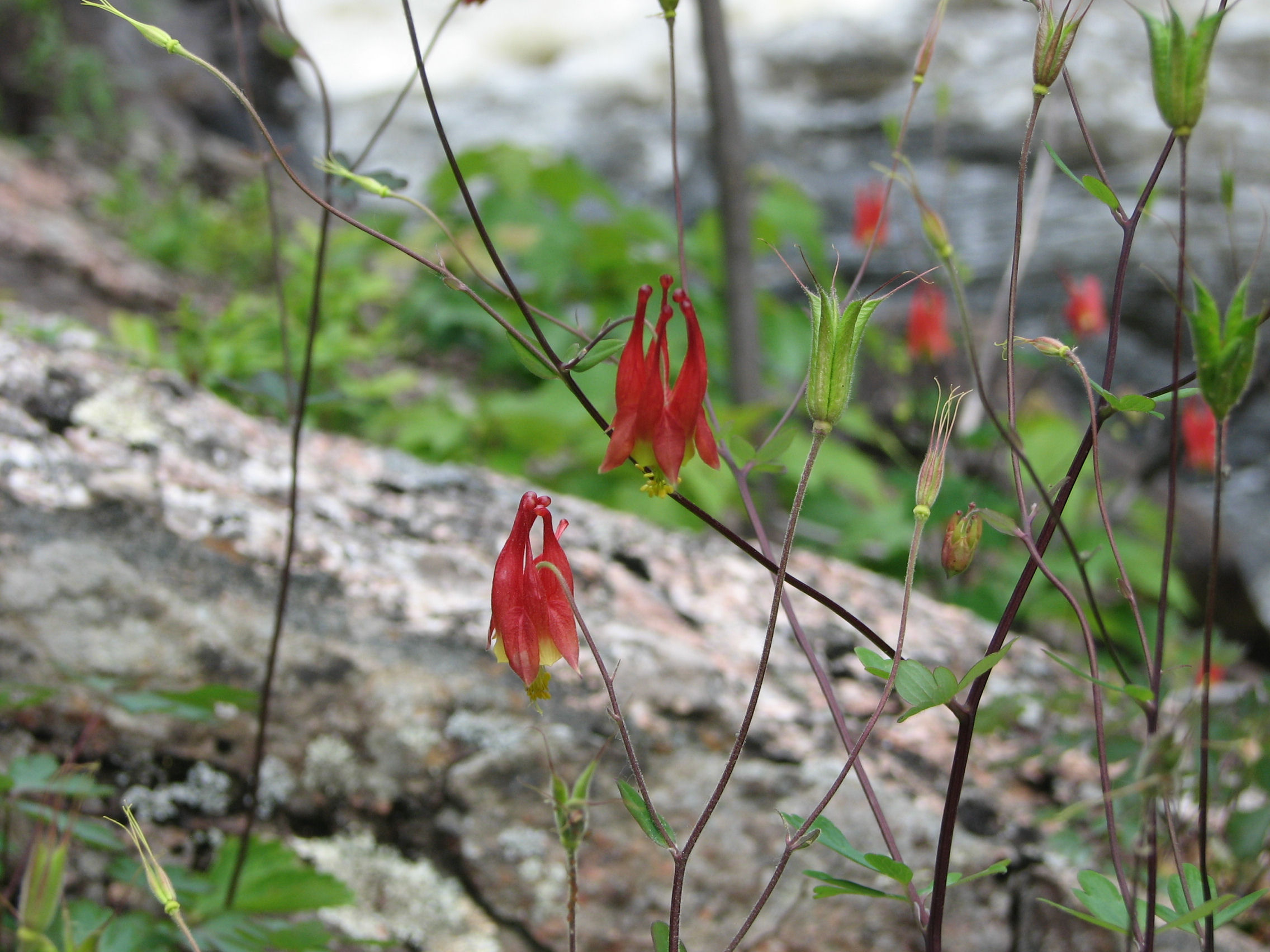
In habitat

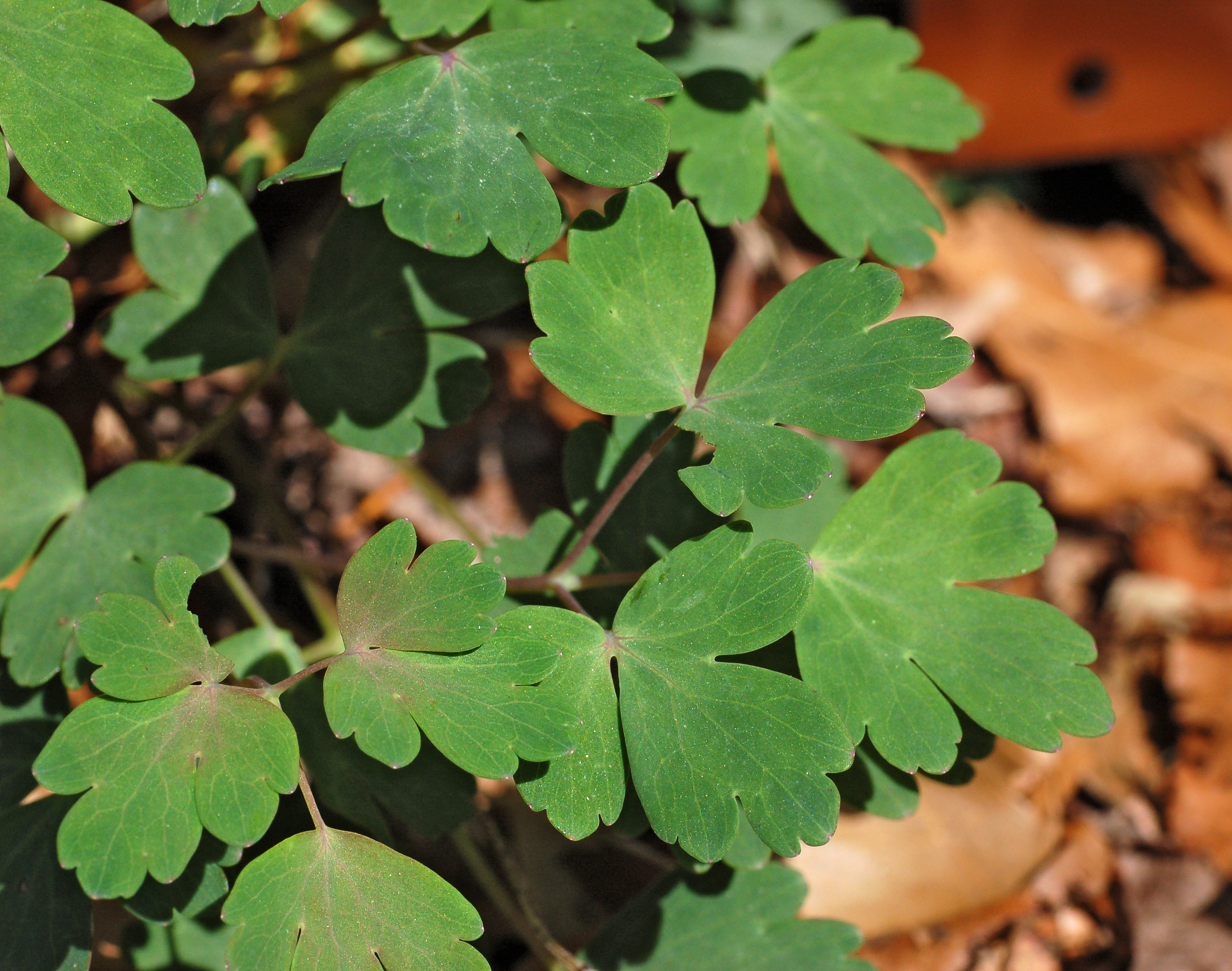
Leaves

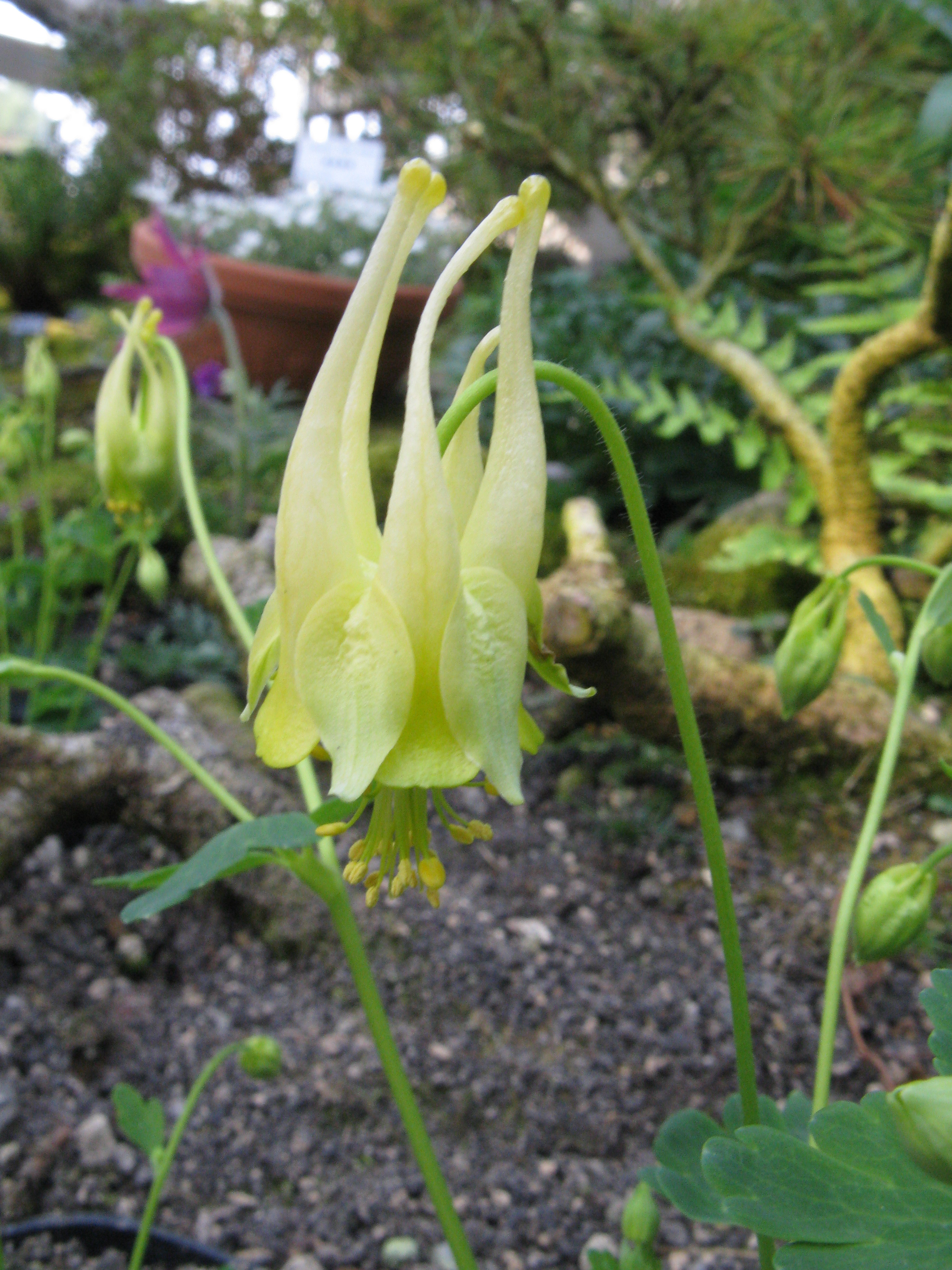
The yellow cultivar 'Corbett'
