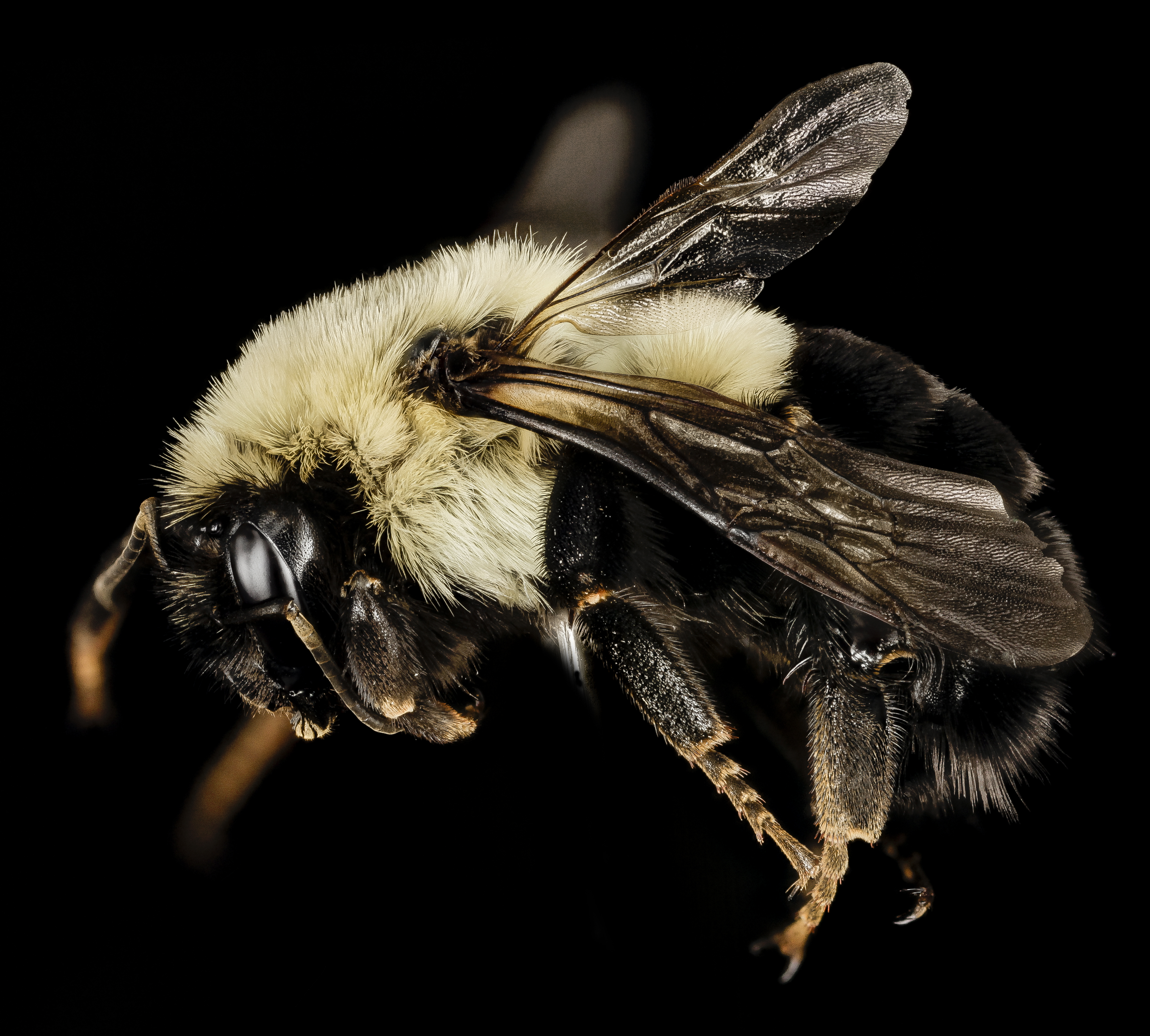
- Queen

Conservation status
- Least Concern (IUCN 3.1)

Scientific classification
- Kingdom: Animalia
- Phylum: Arthropoda
- Clade: Pancrustacea
- Class: Insecta
- Order: Hymenoptera
- Family: Apidae
- Genus: Bombus
- Subgenus: Pyrobombus
- Species: B. impatiens

Binomial name
- Bombus impatiens Cresson, 1863
- US range of Bombus impatiens

= Bombus impatiens =

Species of insect

Bombus impatiens, the common eastern bumblebee, is the most commonly encountered bumblebee across much of eastern North America. They can be found in the Eastern temperate forest region of the eastern United States, southern Canada, and the eastern Great Plains. They are adapted to suburban and urban environments, and as a pollinator species in commercial use by the greenhouse industry. This increase consequently led to their farther spread outside their previous distribution range. They are considered one of the most important species of pollinator bees in North America.

== Taxonomy and phylogeny ==
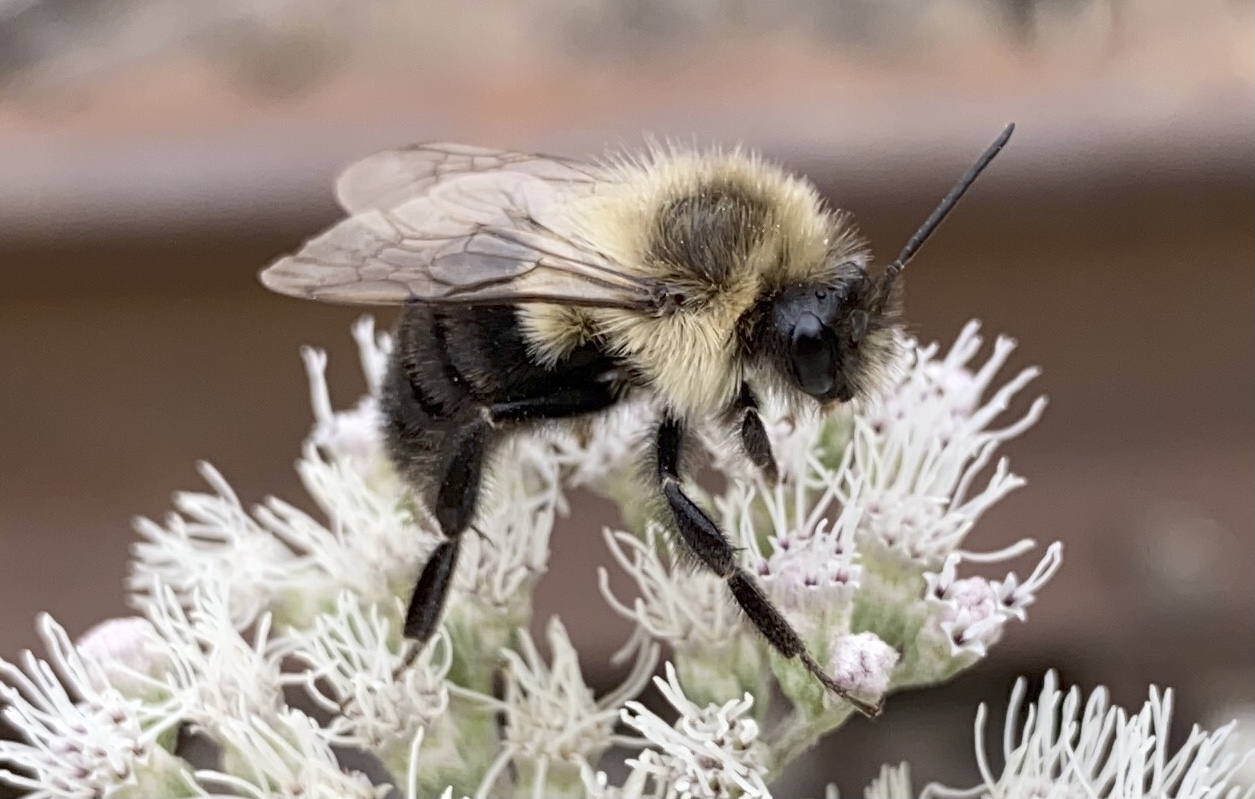
In Newark, New Jersey

The generic epithet (the first part of the name) Bombus comes from the genus Bombus, which is also commonly known as bumblebee and belongs to the tribe Bombini. The specific name (the latter half of its scientific name) may come from the flowers of the genus Impatiens, which is one of its food sources.

Including B. impatiens, the genus Bombus contains 250 species and most species are characterized by their eusociality or parasitic nature. Specifically, the genus Bombus has 49 subgenera, and B. impatiens belongs to the subgenus Pyrobombus. B. impatiens is also of the order Hymenoptera and family Apidae which characterizes its kin selection and relatedness.

== Description and identification ==
=== Queens, workers, and males ===
The bees of B. impatiens are similar to those of B. bimaculatus, B. perplexus, B. vagans, B. sandersoni, and B. separatus in their appearance. They have short and even hair, medium-sized heads with cheeks that are similar in width to their heads, and a long and rectangular body. In general, queens and workers are similar in their coloring, pubescence, and structure. However, with a body length of 17–23 mm, queens have bigger bodies than males or workers. Workers have bodies that are 8.5–16 mm, and males have bodies that are 12–18 mm long. The differences in their sizes can be observed by the differences in their larval weight at second instar. In addition to the difference in their sizes, males slightly differ in their coloring. While queens and workers are both black with a yellow thorax and first abdominal segment, males have a yellow face and head.

== Nests ==
B. impatiens have underground nests that are 1–3 feet below the ground surface. They enter their nests using tunnels that are 18 inches to 9 feet long. Unlike the nests of honeybees or paper wasps, the nests of B. impatiens do not have a predictable pattern. The bees lay egg clumps all over inside the nest instead of having one brood area around which the workers' distribution center is arranged.

Within the nest there is a special division of labor and social organization. 11–13% of workers maintain small spatial fidelity zones inside the nest, and all workers remain at a specific distance from the colony center. Smaller individuals maintained smaller spatial zones and tended to be closer to the center of the nest. Individuals that perform the in-nest task of larval feeding were found in the center of the nest, while foragers were often found on the periphery of the nest when not foraging.

== Distribution and habitat ==
Broadly, they can be found in the Eastern temperate forest region of the eastern United States, southern Canada, and the eastern Great Plains. More specifically, its range includes Ontario, the New England States, Georgia, Mississippi, Kentucky, Tennessee, Alabama, Maryland, Delaware, New Jersey, New York, Pennsylvania, South Carolina, North Carolina, Virginia, West Virginia, south to Florida, west to Michigan, Illinois, Minnesota, Kansas, Missouri, and Iowa. Also, the increase in their commercial use by greenhouse industry led to the spread of the species outside its previous distribution range. Bombus impatiens adapts well to a variety of habitats, nectar sources, and climates and was seen visiting a variety and abundance of plants. In addition to agricultural, wetland, and urban conditions, the species can thrive in wooded habitats, and is likely related to woodland spring ephemerals. It nests underground in open fields and woods.

== Colony ==
To start colonies, the gynes usually leave their hibernacula starting in mid-April and establish colonies in May. In the beginning of June, the workers start to emerge and in August and September the male bees and young queens start appearing. However, at times, the bees can emerge around late to mid-October. In terms of colony sizes, a colony of B. impatiens consists of more than 450 individual bees and most are worker bees.

== Behavior ==
=== Division of labor ===
Inside the nest, the worker bees distribute themselves in a non-random fashion to be a certain distance away from the center of the nest. By doing so they increase their efficiency, as the distance traveled between tasks is minimized. The tasks of some workers are related to their space in the nest. The labor for the workers is divided according to their body sizes. They vary in size, and the smaller bees are usually found near the center of the nest with the job of feeding the larvae whereas the bigger workers are usually found at the periphery, working as foragers and as guards. In general, they keep their spatial pattern as well as their jobs throughout their lifetime.

=== Reproductive suppression ===
Worker bees are totipotent and have the ability to lay eggs, and a few workers even have mature oocytes in their ovaries. However, when there is a queen in the colony, the workers do not attempt to lay eggs or develop eggs. They usually do not show aggression towards other workers or the queen, showing no "competition phase." Without a queen, aggression is more common.

=== Mating ===
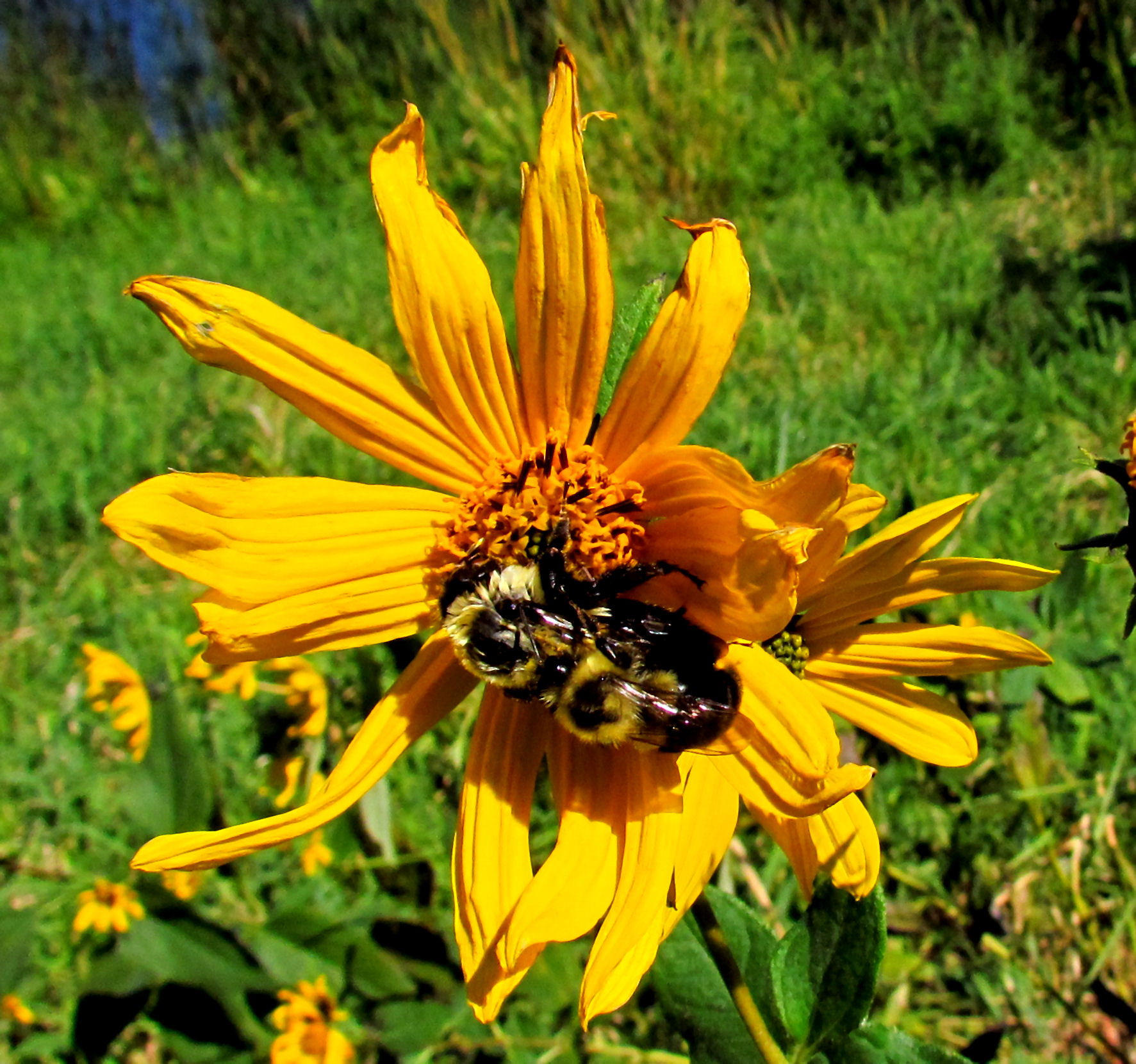
Queen and drone mating

A gyne mates with a male bee near the end of the hive's life cycle. They rest on the ground or on vegetation in order to mate and the mating lasts from 10 to 80 minutes. In order to increase the probability of his genes getting passed down safely, the male mates for a certain amount of time to let his sperm harden during mating. Soon thereafter the gynes hibernate. The following spring they emerge from hibernation and set about to get strong on nectar and to find a suitable old mouse or chipmunk hole to begin a colony. The first thing she builds is a honeypot, then she fills it with food (nectar/pollen), making it easier to feed her new brood, which are raised in paper cells she builds. The queens lay about 2000 eggs in one season, but only half of them will survive to become full adults.

=== Survival adaptations ===
Diapausing B. impatiens queens have been observed to survive extended periods of submersion in water by employing physiological adaptations of underwater respiration, anaerobic metabolism, and extensive metabolic depression. These mechanisms enables common eastern bumblebee queens to remain submerged underwater for up to a week without succumbing to hypoxia or drowning, which may help them endure flooding or wet overwintering conditions before founding new colonies.

== Foraging ==
=== Traplining ===
Foragers of B. impatiens colonies use a strategy called traplining, in which the bees visit their food sources in a repeatable sequence, to improve their efficiency, especially in an unfamiliar environment. The bees establish traplines by searching among flowers in an orderly manner. Upon establishment, the traplines remain stable for long periods of time. Traplining has many advantages. The bees can minimize both the distance traveled by linking the sources in a more direct path and the time spent searching by knowing the locations of food sources. Also, the bees can travel through the locations that were recently depleted of their resources, saving their energy and time.

=== Communication ===
B. impatiens use communication in order to maximize the benefit of foraging. The bees become faster and more accurate as they become more experienced at foraging, and the returning foragers tend to stimulate the foraging activity of the colony. The foragers of B. impatiens improve their foraging activity by communicating with others in their nests. They share their abilities to associate scents of good food sources.

== Interaction with other species ==
=== Diet ===
There are many food plants for B. impatiens including: "Aster", Cirsium, Eupatorium, Gelsemium, Malus, Pontederia, Rubus, Solidago, Trifolium, Crocus, Pieris, Rhododendron, barberry, mountain laurel, rose, clover, purple vetch, pickerel weed, purple loosestrife, buttonbush, beggar's ticks, goldenrod, boneset, burdock, and Impatiens from which the bee's name may come. The bees can eat the raw materials like pollen and nectar of the flowers but most bees in the colony eat honey that is made using the raw materials since it has higher nutritional value. To create honey, the bees consume the pollen and the nectar, and then regurgitate them, mixing them with enzymes in their stomachs.

=== Parasites ===
Bombus impatiens are hosts to other bees. Ps. Laborious and Bombus citrinus are some examples of parasites. Also, Entromopox-like viruses and prokaryotes called Spiroplasmataceae have been found in the workers. However, there is no known harmful effect to B. impatiens.

== Importance to humans ==
Bees play in a significant role in pollinating crops. A decline in bee population leads to a decline in crop yield, which will then result in a reduction in the food supply and cause economic hardships for farmers. Commercially produced B. impatiens is one of the most important species of pollinator bees that are used by greenhouse industry in North America, including Canada and Mexico. They are efficient pollinators and natives to East North America. The interest in B. impatiens has been increased even more due to the decline of pollinator bee population like A. mellifera and the ban on importing B. terrestris into North America. They are used as pollinator bees for tomatoes, blueberries, raspberries, and pumpkins.
