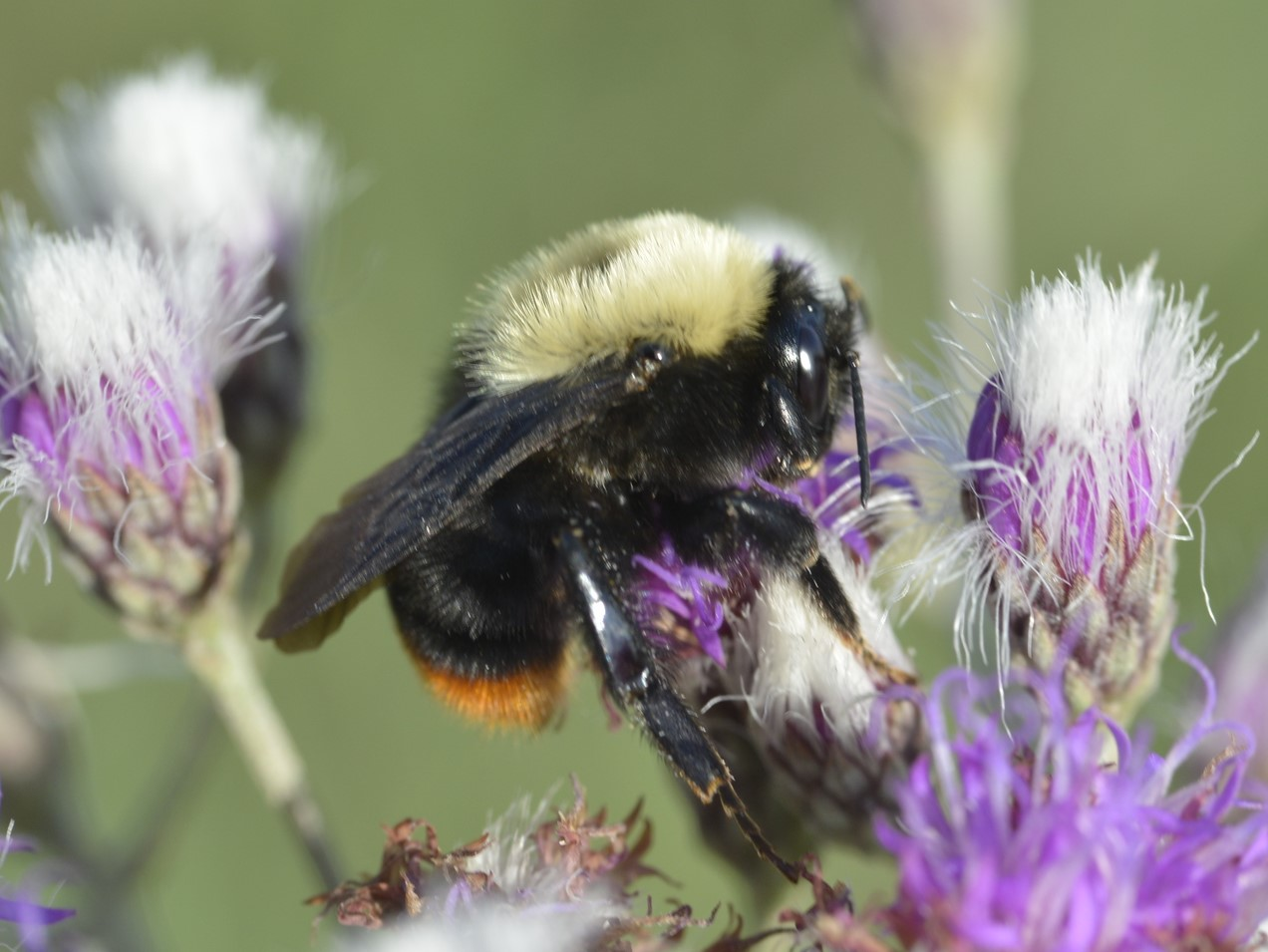

Conservation status
- Data Deficient (IUCN 3.1)

Scientific classification
- Kingdom: Animalia
- Phylum: Arthropoda
- Clade: Pancrustacea
- Class: Insecta
- Order: Hymenoptera
- Family: Apidae
- Genus: Bombus
- Subgenus: Thoracobombus
- Species: B. bellicosus

Binomial name
- Bombus bellicosus Smith, 1879

= Bombus bellicosus =

Species of bee

Bombus bellicosus is a species of bumblebee in the subgenus Thoracobombus. It is commonly known as the bellicose bumblebee. They have a yellow thorax, black wings, and a black and orange abdomen. B. bellicosus are eusocial insects found in South America, alongside a species called Bombus pauloensis. They primarily live in the grasslands and in shrubs, from Northern Argentina to Southern Brazil. They eat nectar from red clovers, bird's foot trefoil, wild radish, and bugleweed. The species was named by Frederick Smith in 1879 in his publication called "Descriptions of New Species of Hymenoptera in the Collection of the British Museum."

== Description ==
The bellicose bumblebees look similar to other bumblebees, being black, yellow and orange. Their antennae, head and eyes are entirely black. The thorax on the dorsal side has yellow hairs, with a patch of black exoskeleton lacking hair visible in the centre. The abdomen is black in the first ~4 tergites, and orange in the last ~3. Bellicose bees have long hairs on the tibia of their back legs to collect pollen like other bumblebees.

== Habitat ==
B. bellicosus are a South American species of bumblebee. They are found alongside species such as B. pauloensis, and are found in Argentina, Uruguay and throughout Brazil. B. bellicosus has been observed to be disappearing from its north-eastern boundary, the state of Parana. Bellicose bumblebees are known to build hives underground, under soil and leaf litter, which is common in bumblebee species. Shrubs and grasslands are their preferred vegetation.

== Reproduction ==
Artificial breeding and raising of bellicose bumblebees has been attempted so their reproduction can be better understood. These efforts did not lead to conclusive knowledge of the details of reproduction in B. bellicosus, and many queens died before oviposition of the eggs. It can be assumed that B. bellicosus reproduces similar to other bumblebees.

== Behaviour ==
=== Feeding ===
Bellicose bumblebees feed on nectar from flowers for energy, as well as collected pollen for protein and for larvae. They use their proboscis to eat. Based on individual differences, such as proboscis length, the bee's will have preferences for different flowers. This is due to the corolla depth, referring to the depth of the flower. B. bellicosus also tend to exploit flowers from a range of species, as one species does not tend to bloom year-round. They have been found to exploit two common legume flowers based on their proboscis length, which suggest that they value resource efficiency and maximization.

=== Pollination ===
These bees have been described as excellent pollinators, and significantly contribute to pollination in their habitats. This has been found in Uruguay, where scientists discovered that the work of bellicose bumblebees and B. pauloensis increased seed yield for red clover plants with their efficiency of pollination.

B. bellicosus also displays a plant choice while foraging. They choose 1-2 plant species per foraging trip on average, and when they choose 2 plant species, 1 will be more dominant than the other. This is likely because they follow the optimal foraging theory, and choose one plant to maximize how efficient their pollination and pollen collection is per trip. This strategy also increases cross-pollination, making them better pollinators by helping the plant species pollinate their flowers.

== Conservation ==
Bees in general are facing hardship in today's climate, with many species being threatened or near extinction. The bellicose bee was found in Parana, a state of Brazil, in a survey done in the early 1960s. They were seen less in a survey done in the early 1980s, and a survey done in the early 2000s found none of them. In some earlier studies, they were finding that B. bellicosus was covering their brood cells with wax. This is done in other bumblebee species, but only when climates are getting too cold. The grasslands in Parana also have decreased due to urban expansion, causing habitat loss. With the northern most boundary being the boundary experiencing extirpation, local extinction, it is likely due to a change in climate.

Bees are victim to many parasites, including both mites and pathogens. These are key factors to understanding how to prevent extinction in bee species

=== Parasitic mites ===
Bumblebees are known to be a host to many types of phoretic mites. Around 34% of B. bellicosus sampled in a study were found to be infected with at least one type of mite. The most common mite species found on bellicose bees are Kuzinia spp., Scutacarus acarorum, Pneumolaelaps longanalis, Pneumolaelaps longiplius, and Tyrophagus putres-centiae. These species are found in the families Acaridae, Scutacaridae, Laelapidae, Laelapidae and Acaridae respectively. These mites will live in the nest, and attach to bees when the mites are intending to disperse or move with the bees to a new hive. These mites typically will stick to the queens, as the queen has the longest life cycle and provides the best opportunity for dispersal. In large numbers, the mites can affect ease of motion on the bumblebees. In extreme cases, this leads to death due to not being able to move. While some mites are beneficial to the bees, a lot of the mites have unknown effects and should be studied more intensively to determine if they are a potential cause for declining populations of Bombus bellicosus.

=== Fungal infection ===
Nosema ceranae is a fungus species that can be found on bellicose bumblebees. It can be found in many bees, including Apis mellifera, the common Western Honeybee. In a sample of 364 bees (both B. bellicosus and B. pauloensis), 84% of them had detectable levels of N. ceranae spores. Female bees had higher infection rates than males in both species. While it is possible that the bees are only a carrier of the pathogen, meaning they are not affected themselves, they carry very high numbers which can be responsible for the decline in population of other bees. Nosema ceranae can be deadly to other species such as Apis mellifera. The effect of Nosema ceranae in B. bellicosus is not enitirely clear, so whether this is a prevalent cause of their decline is unknown.
