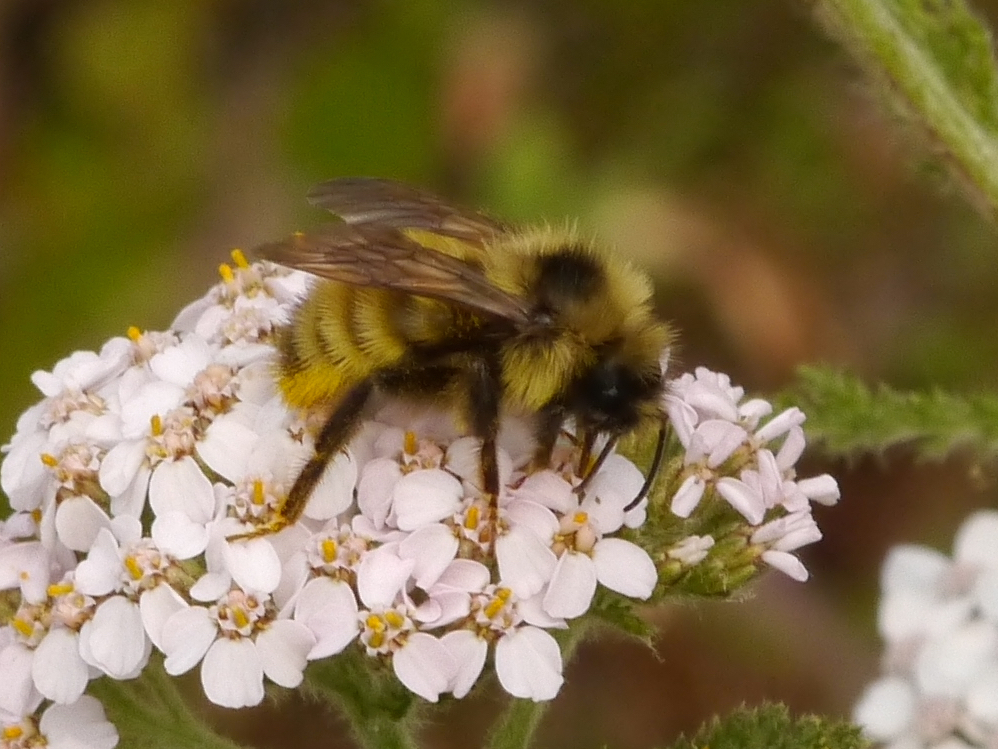

Scientific classification
- Domain: Eukaryota
- Kingdom: Animalia
- Phylum: Arthropoda
- Class: Insecta
- Order: Hymenoptera
- Family: Apidae
- Genus: Bombus
- Subgenus: Psithyrus
- Species: B. fernaldae

Binomial name
- Bombus fernaldae (Franklin, 1911)

= Bombus fernaldae =

Fernald's cuckoo bumblebee

Species of bee

Bombus fernaldae, the Fernald's cuckoo bumblebee, is a species of cuckoo bumblebee having only males and queens, but no worker bees. The females place their eggs in the nest of the confusing bumblebee (Bombus perplexus) or the red-belted bumblebee (Bombus rufocinctus), which raise the larvae. Fernald's cuckoo bumblebees visit flowers of Potentilla, Rubus, clovers, and goldenrods.
