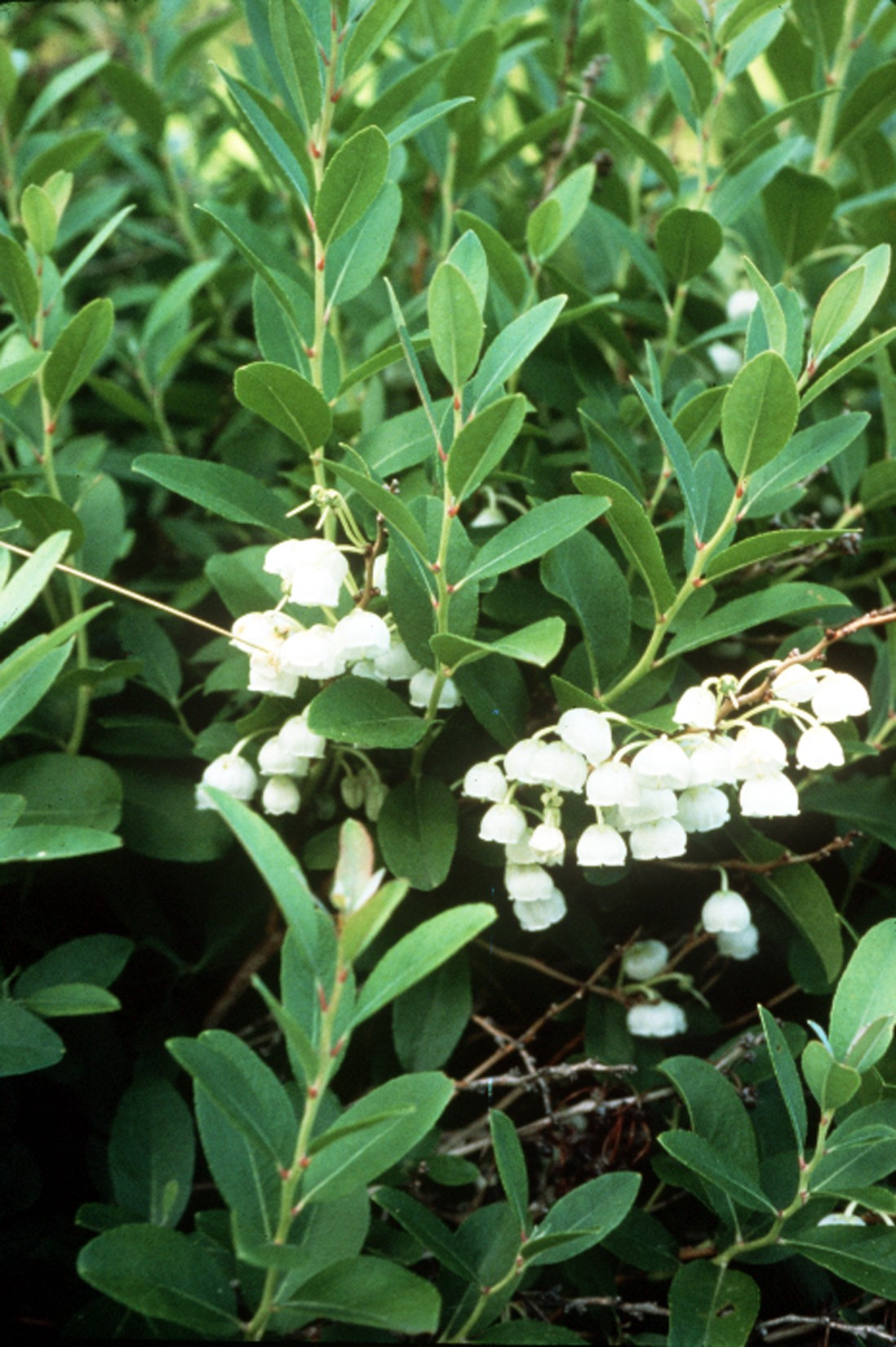
- Zenobia pulverulenta

Scientific classification
- Kingdom: Plantae
- Clade: Tracheophytes
- Clade: Angiosperms
- Clade: Eudicots
- Clade: Asterids
- Order: Ericales
- Family: Ericaceae
- Subfamily: Vaccinioideae
- Tribe: Andromedeae
- Genus: Zenobia; D.Don 1834

Type species
- Zenobia speciosa (Michx.) D.Don 1834

= Zenobia (plant) =

Genus of shrubs

Zenobia, called honeycup, is a monotypic North American genus of shrubs in the family Ericaceae.

== Description ==
Zenobia is a hairless shrub, sometimes with a waxy coating on the foliage. The leaves are elliptical or egg-shaped. The plant has numerous white flowers in flat-topped or elongated arrays, each flower has five separate sepals and five united petals, forming a bell-shaped corolla. Each flower can produce up to 200 egg-shaped seeds in a dry capsule.

== Fossil record ==
Ten fossil fruits of †Zenobia fasterholtensis have been described from middle Miocene strata of the Fasterholt area near Silkeborg in Central Jutland, Denmark.

Species

- Zenobia pulverulenta (W. Bartram ex Willd.) Pollard
