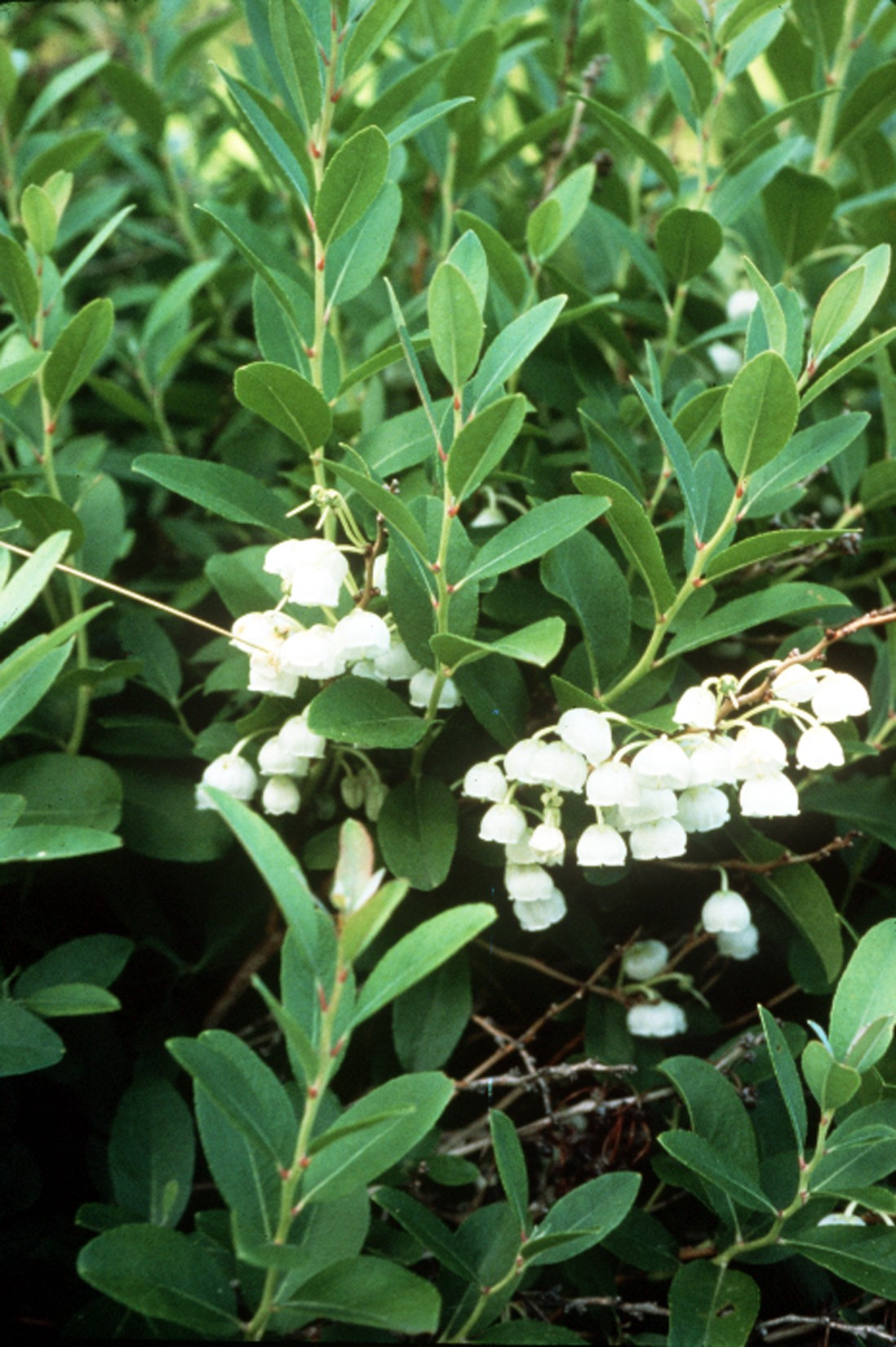

Conservation status
- Apparently Secure (NatureServe)

Scientific classification
- Kingdom: Plantae
- Clade: Tracheophytes
- Clade: Angiosperms
- Clade: Eudicots
- Clade: Asterids
- Order: Ericales
- Family: Ericaceae
- Genus: Zenobia
- Species: Z. pulverulenta

Binomial name
- Zenobia pulverulenta (Bartram ex Willd.) Pollard

Synonyms
- List: Andromeda cassinefolia var. nuda Vent.; Andromeda cassinefolia var. pulverulenta (W.Bartram) Vent.; Andromeda cassinefolia Vent.; Andromeda condida Dippel; Andromeda dealbata Lindl.; Andromeda glauca (P.Watson) Paxton; Andromeda nitida (Michx.) Sims; Andromeda nuda Voss; Andromeda ovata Sol. ex DC.; Andromeda pulverulenta var. nuda (Vent.) C.K.Schneid.; Andromeda pulverulenta var. typica C.K.Schneid.; Andromeda pulverulenta W.Bartram; Andromeda serratifolia DC.; Andromeda speciosa Michx.; Andromeda speciosa var. glauca P.Watson; Andromeda speciosa var. nitida Michx.; Andromeda speciosa var. pulverulenta (W.Bartram) Michx.; Lyonia pulverulenta (W.Bartram) K.Koch; Zenobia cassinefolia (Vent.) Pollard; Zenobia dealbata D.Don ex Steud.; Zenobia pulverulenta f. nitida (Michx.) Fernald; Zenobia pulverulenta var. nuda (Vent.) Rehder; Zenobia pulverulenta f. nuda (Vent.) Fernald; Zenobia speciosa (Michx.) D.Don; Zenobia speciosa var. nitida (Michx.) Rehder; Zenobia speciosa var. pulverulenta (W.Bartram) DC.; Zenobia speciosa var. viridis DC.

= Zenobia pulverulenta =

Species of shrub

Zenobia pulverulenta, the honeycup, is a North American species of shrubs. It is the sole extant species of the genus Zenobia, in the family Ericaceae. It is native to coastal plain of the Southeastern United States, in North Carolina, South Carolina, and Virginia.

== Description ==
Zenobia pulverulenta is a deciduous or semi-evergreen shrub growing to 0.5–1.8 m (2–6 ft) tall. The leaves are spirally arranged, ovate to elliptic, 2–7 cm (1–3 in) long.

The flowers are white, bell-shaped, 12 mm (0.47 in) long and 10 mm (0.39 in) broad, and sweetly scented. The fruit is a dry five-valved capsule.
