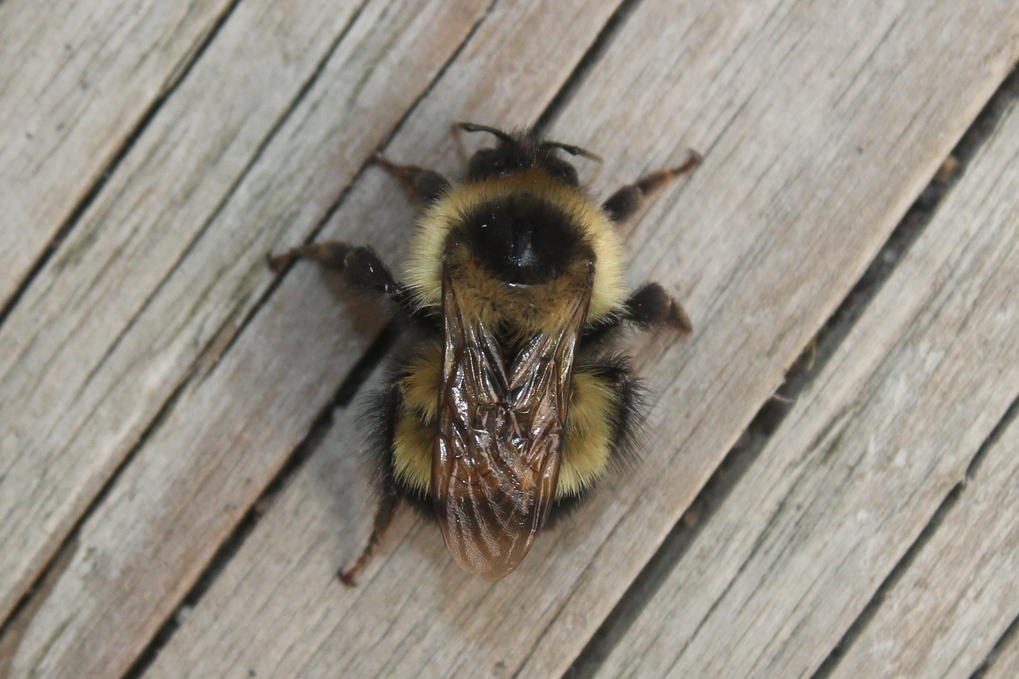

Conservation status
- Least Concern (IUCN 3.1)

Scientific classification
- Domain: Eukaryota
- Kingdom: Animalia
- Phylum: Arthropoda
- Class: Insecta
- Order: Hymenoptera
- Family: Apidae
- Genus: Bombus
- Subgenus: Pyrobombus
- Species: B. sandersoni

Binomial name
- Bombus sandersoni Franklin, 1913

= Bombus sandersoni =

Species of bee

Bombus sandersoni is a species of bumblebee known commonly as the Sanderson bumblebee. It is native to North America, where it occurs across Canada and in the eastern United States.

The queen is 15 to 16 millimeters long and 6 millimeters wide at the abdomen. It is black with pale hairs on the head and yellow on the abdomen. The worker is up to 13 millimeters long and 5 millimeters wide. It is similar to the queen except the tip of the abdomen is black. The male is 10 to 13 millimeters long and 5 to 6 millimeters wide. It has long hairs, yellow on the head and part of the abdomen and black at the end of the abdomen.

This bee occurs in maritime Canada, temperate forest, the Canadian Prairies, tundra, and taiga. It lives in and around wooded areas. It feeds on several types of plants, including cohosh, fireweeds, kalmia, honeysuckles, bergamot, blackberries, and bilberries. It nests underground.

This bee has faced no significant declines. It may, however, be more sensitive to climate change than other bee taxa.

This species was found to harbor the bee parasite Nosema bombi.
