= Scutacaridae =

Scientific classification
- Domain: Eukaryota
- Kingdom: Animalia
- Phylum: Arthropoda
- Subphylum: Chelicerata
- Class: Arachnida
- Order: Trombidiformes
- Family: Scutacaridae

Synonyms
- Disparipedidae

Family of mites

Scutacaridae is a family of mites belonging to the order Trombidiformes.

== Genera ==
Genera:

- Arachnopes Ebermann, 1984
- Bruneipes Mahunka & Mahunka-Papp, 1992
- Diversipes Berlese, 1903
