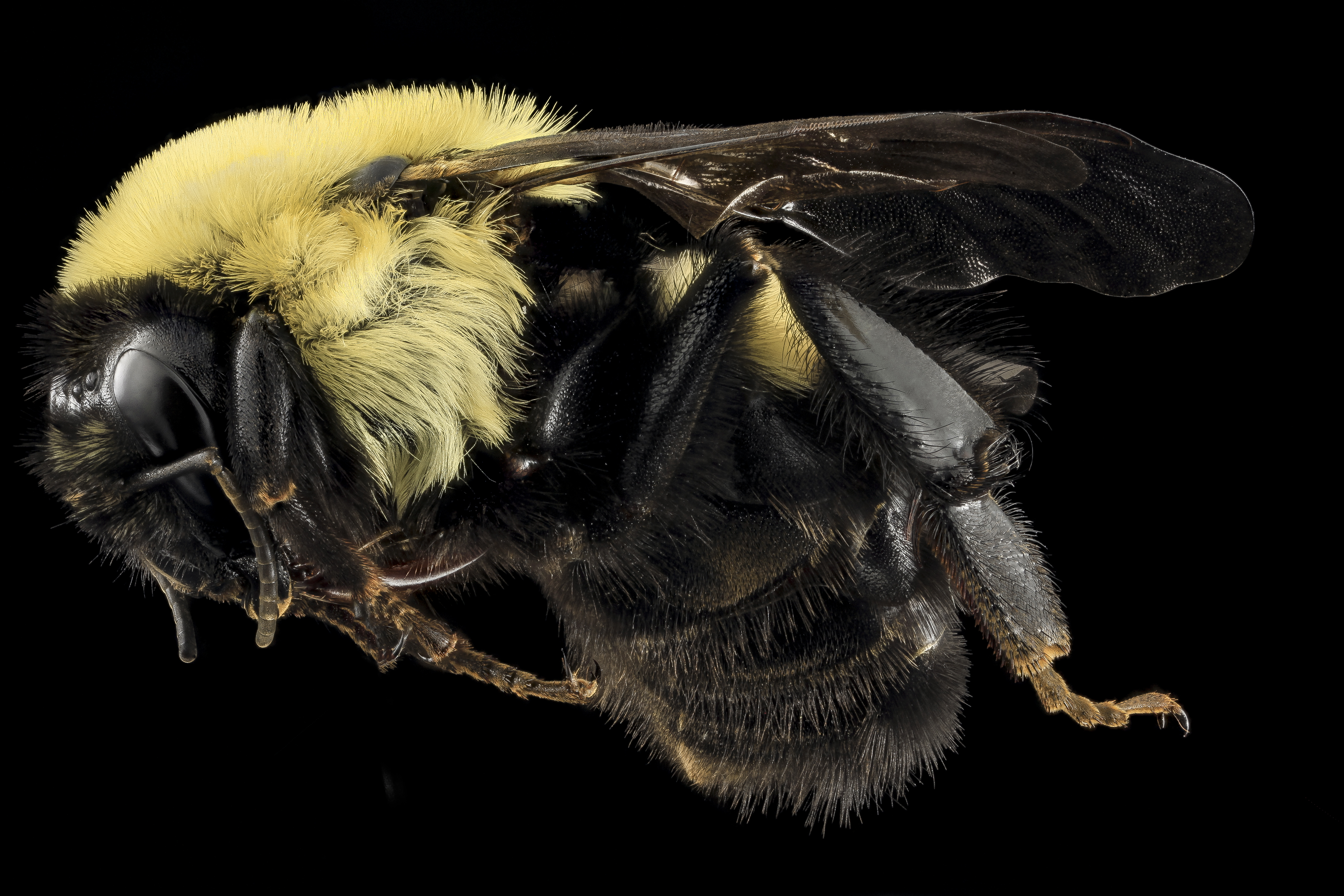
- Queen

Conservation status
- Least Concern (IUCN 3.1)

Scientific classification
- Kingdom: Animalia
- Phylum: Arthropoda
- Class: Insecta
- Order: Hymenoptera
- Family: Apidae
- Genus: Bombus
- Subgenus: Cullumanobombus
- Species: B. griseocollis

Binomial name
- Bombus griseocollis (De Geer, 1773)

= Bombus griseocollis =

Species of bee

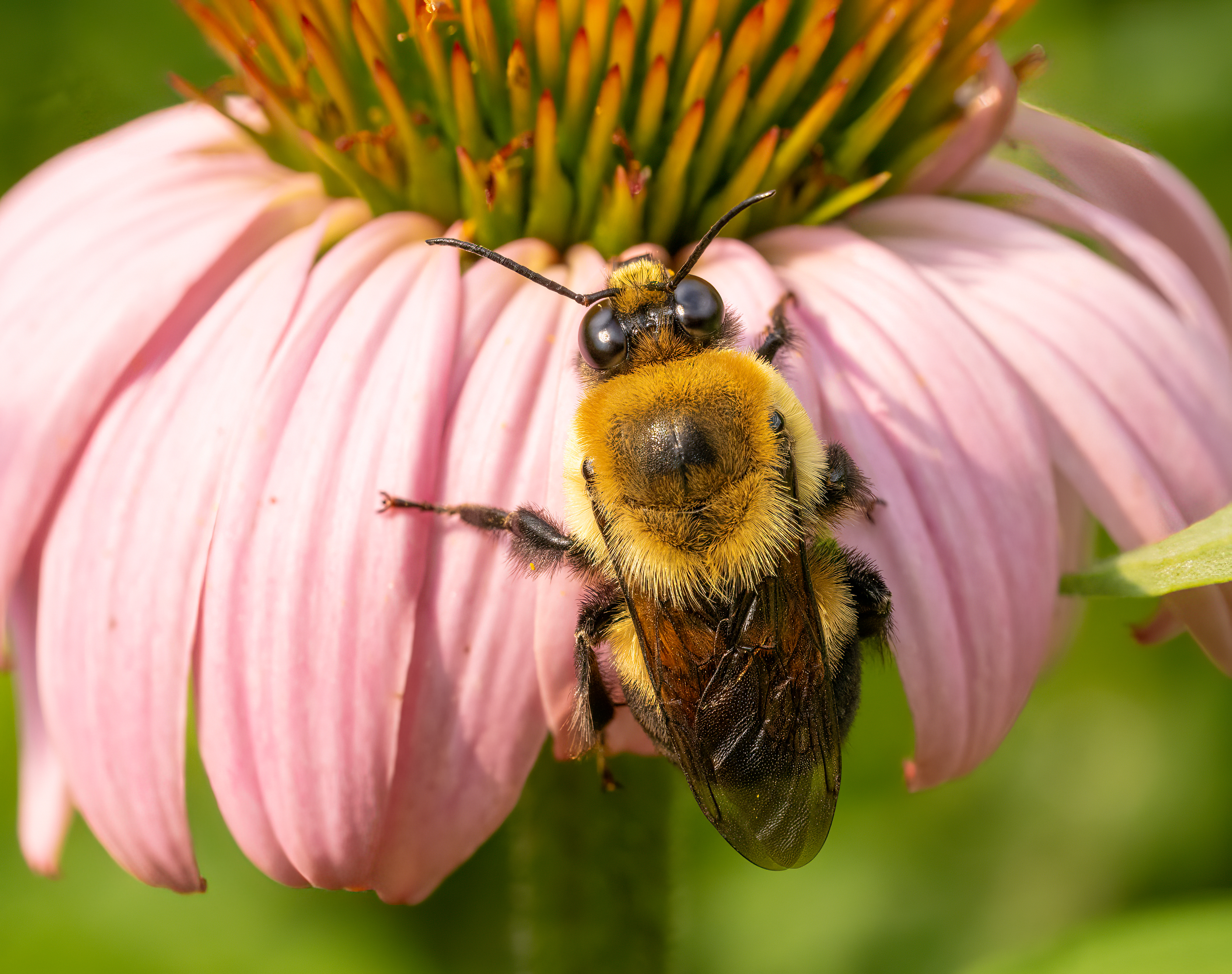
B. griseocollis in New York

Bombus griseocollis is a species of bumblebee known commonly as the brown-belted bumblebee. It is native to much of the United States except for the Southwest, and to the southernmost regions of several of the provinces of Canada.

== Description ==
The queen is 2.1 to 2.3 centimeters long and about a centimeter wide at the abdomen. Its head and face are black with scattered yellow hairs. The thorax is coated in yellow hairs. The abdomen is yellow banded with black, with a black posterior and black ventral surface. The legs are black.

Workers are smaller than the queen, sometimes less than a centimeter long. They are similar in color pattern, but may have a brown-yellow band around the abdomen.

Males are about 1.5 to 1.9 centimeters long and about 0.7 centimeters wide at the abdomen. They have very large eyes that span about two thirds the width of the head. The face and thorax have yellow hairs and the abdomen is banded with yellow, yellow-brown, and black.

Eggs are white, robust, and slightly curved. The average length is 2.91 mm with a range of 2.8–3.1 mm and the diameter range is 0.8–1.00 mm.

== Biology ==
This bumblebee can occupy many kinds of habitat, including meadows, wetlands, agricultural fields, and urban areas, even densely populated cities. It is a common pollinator in community gardens in New York City and it has been observed near the top of the Empire State Building over 100 stories above ground level. Bombus griseocollis is found in the southern parts of most Canadian provinces except the Maritimes and most American states excluding the southwest.

This bee feeds at many kinds of plants, such as milkweeds, prairie clovers, echinaceas, loosestrife, bergamot, pickerel weeds, rudbeckias, goldenrods, clovers, and vetches. The queens particularly favor legumes.

This species nests underground or on the surface. Nests are generally small colonies of fewer than 50 workers, but they aggressively defend their establishments. This is a eusocial bee, one that forms a colony that works together to rear young with labor divided amongst reproductive and non-reproductive castes. All the daily tasks in the nest are performed by worker bees of all age groups, .

Specific tasks performed by workers include secreting wax and using it to glue the nest to a substrate, using harvested material to insulate the nest, incubating pupae by wrapping their bodies around the cocoons, regurgitating food for larvae, scraping wax off of discarded pupal cases and recycling it in the construction of honey pots, buzzing when alarmed, inspecting and patrolling the nest, foraging, and feeding.

Males perform the task of inseminating queens. They perch in areas where young queens might pass, awaiting mating opportunities. They scent mark their perches using a glandular secretion containing tetradecyl acetate and butyric acid. This is likely a signal to other males rather than to females. Males of this species also help to incubate pupae, a task done only by workers in most bee species. This is accomplished by the bee wrapping itself around the cocoon and then pumping the abdomen. More than one bee (male or female) can simultaneously incubate an egg. However, males cannot raise the temperature as high as queens can, but can maintain raised temperatures.

== Predation ==
Like many insects, these bumblebees may be attacked by parasites. Conopids (thick-headed flies) force their victims to dig their own grave; however, brown belted bumblebees show an unusual resistance to conopid mind control, with only 18% of them giving in, one quarter of the rate of other bumblebee victims.

== Conservation ==
This is a common species in much of its wide range. Unlike many bumblebees in North America, it has experienced an average decline of 0%, and in some areas its populations may be increasing. It apparently faces no serious threats.
