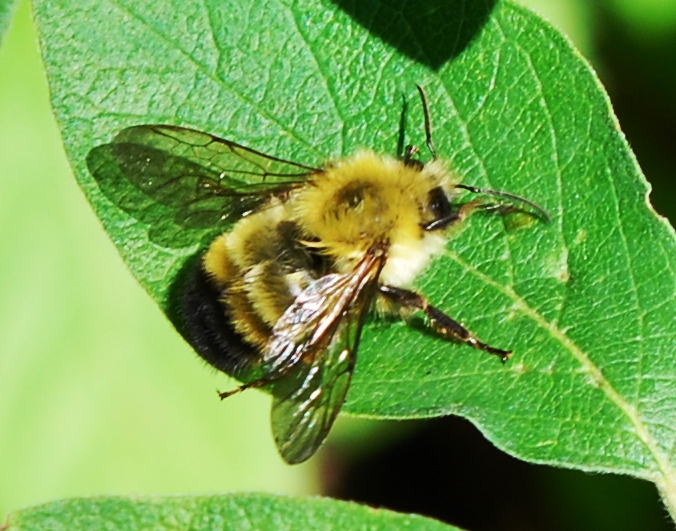

Conservation status
- Least Concern (IUCN 3.1)

Scientific classification
- Domain: Eukaryota
- Kingdom: Animalia
- Phylum: Arthropoda
- Class: Insecta
- Order: Hymenoptera
- Family: Apidae
- Genus: Bombus
- Subgenus: Pyrobombus
- Species: B. perplexus

Binomial name
- Bombus perplexus Cresson, 1863

= Bombus perplexus =

Species of bee

Bombus perplexus is a species of bumblebee known by the common name confusing bumblebee. It is native to northern North America, where it occurs across Canada and into the eastern United States.

The queen is 1.7 to 2.1 centimeters long and just under a centimeter wide at the abdomen. It is mostly black with areas of pale hairs. The worker female is 1.2 to 1.4 centimeters long and half a centimeter wide. It is hairier than the queen and has more yellow hairs. The abdomen is black and yellow. The male is the same size as the worker. The mandibles have reddish tips. It has white hairs on the head and legs and yellow and white hairs on the thorax.

This species occurs in the maritime regions of Canada, taiga, tundra, temperate forests, and the Canadian Prairies. It can be found in wetland habitat, wooded areas, and urban gardens. It feeds on many kinds of plants, such as bellflowers, thistles, honeysuckles, penstemons, pickerel weeds, and lindens. It may be a host to Fernald's cuckoo bumblebee (B. fernaldae).
