= Nosema bombi =

Scientific classification
- Kingdom: Fungi
- Phylum: Rozellomycota
- Class: Microsporidia
- Family: Nosematidae
- Genus: Nosema
- Species: N. bombi

Binomial name
- Nosema bombi Fantham & Porter

Species of microsporidian

Nosema bombi is a microsporidian, a small, unicellular parasite recently reclassified as a fungus that mainly affects bumble bees. It was reclassified as Vairimorpha bombi in 2020. The parasite infects numerous Bombus spp. at variable rates, and has been found to have a range of deleterious effects on its hosts.

== Life cycle stages ==
Nosema bombi, like other microsporidians, has two major life cycle stages, a spore stage and a vegetative stage. In most cases, the spore is ingested by the host, infecting host cells in the gut lumen and the Malpighian tubules. During reproduction and proliferation the parasite spreads within the host. Fresh spores are then released into the environment via feces or a decaying host.

== Transmission ==
The parasite is believed to rely mainly on horizontal transmission between colonies via infected workers contaminating shared food sources such as pollen or nectar, but there is some evidence that it may also be transmitted vertically. Males may transmit the infection to new queens during mating. N. bombi infection prevalence has been reported to vary widely over time. For example, Manlik et al. (2017) reported that N. bombi infection prevalence in buff-tailed bumble bees (Bombus terrestris) fluctuated between 2% (2010) and 81% (2003) in Neunforn, Switzerland. Moreover, N. bombi infection of this bumblebee population is associated with climate change, with higher infection prevalence during hotter, drier years.

== Effects on host ==
Studies have found conflicting results as to the effects of N. bombi on bumble bee health. Some field studies have found little to no negative effects on colony size or success, while others have found that infected queens produce smaller colony sizes and reduced sexual offspring. Under laboratory conditions, the fungus has been found to affect the survival and efficiency of adult individuals as well as the sperm counts of male offspring.

== Concerns ==
Of the estimated 250–300 bumble bee species in the world, several are now being commercially mass-reared and distributed for crop pollination. When screened, many of these commercially reared bumblebees have been found to contain pollinator parasites. There is some concern that higher infection rates among commercial colonies may lead to N. bombi spillover into wild bumble bee populations.
