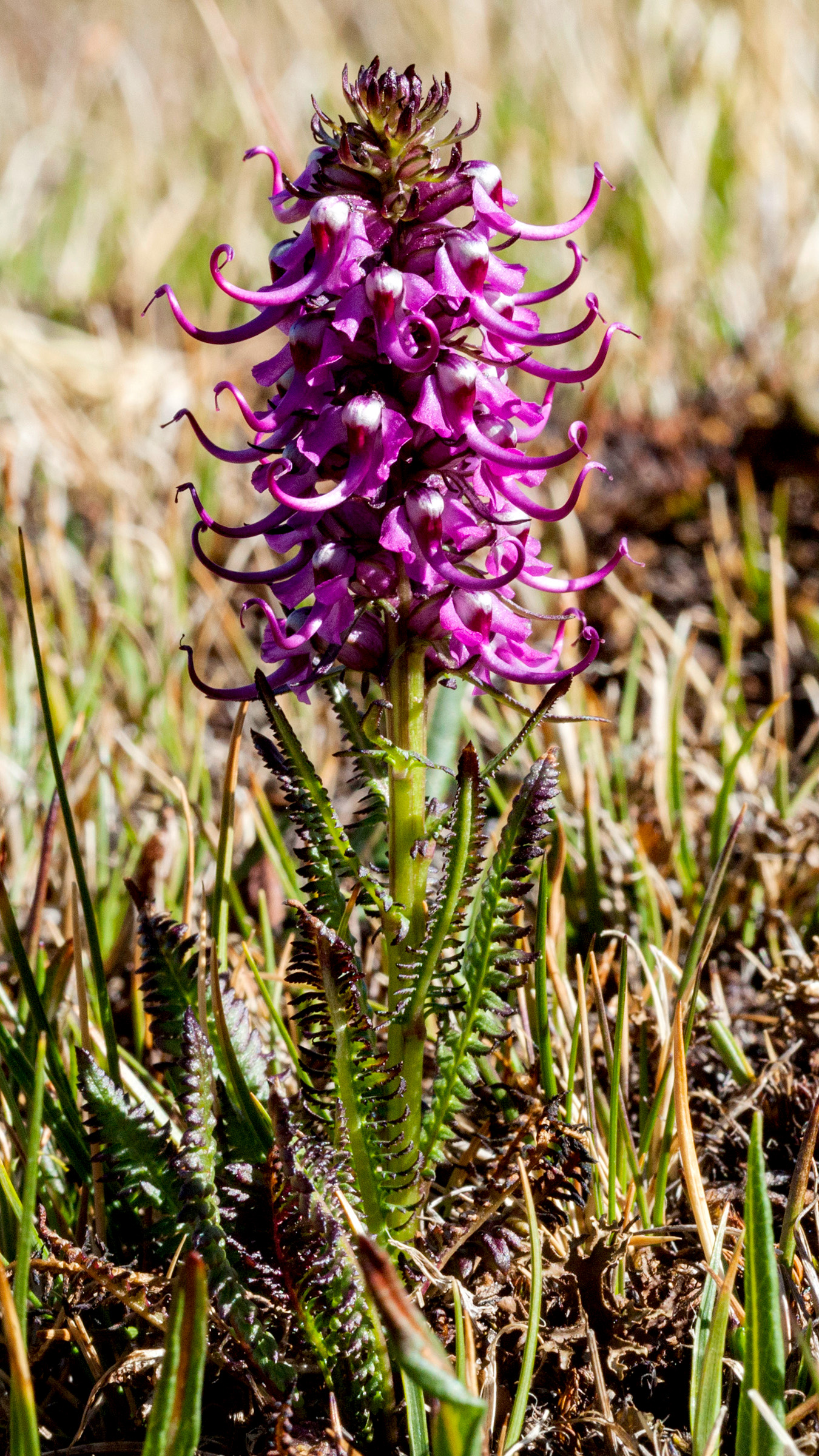
- Sangre de Cristo Mountains, New Mexico

Conservation status
- Least Concern (IUCN 3.1)

- Secure (NatureServe)

Scientific classification
- Kingdom: Plantae
- Clade: Tracheophytes
- Clade: Angiosperms
- Clade: Eudicots
- Clade: Asterids
- Order: Lamiales
- Family: Orobanchaceae
- Genus: Pedicularis
- Species: P. groenlandica

Binomial name
- Pedicularis groenlandica Retz.
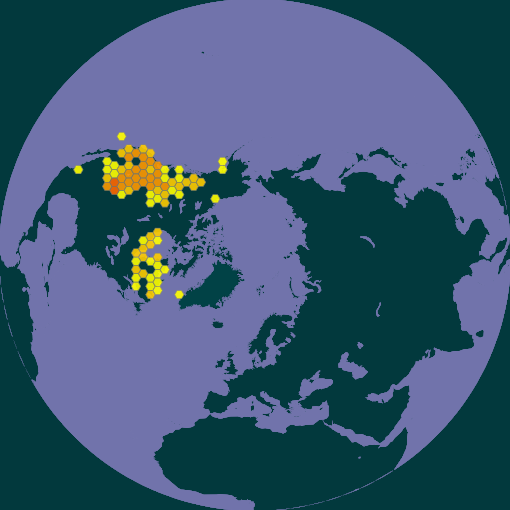
- Global range of Pedicularis groenlandica from GBIF (January 2023)

Synonyms
- Elephantella groenlandica (Retz.) Rydb.; Elephantella groenlandica var. surrecta (Benth.) Moldenke; Pedicularis groenlandica f. chlorina Stanif., P.F.Maycock & J.Svoboda; Pedicularis groenlandica f. gracilis Lepage; Pedicularis groenlandica f. pallida Lepage; Pedicularis groenlandica var. surrecta (Benth.) A.Gray; Pedicularis groenlandica subsp. surrecta (Benth.) Penn.; Pedicularis surrecta Benth.

= Pedicularis groenlandica =

North American species of flowering plant

Pedicularis groenlandica is a showy flowering plant in the family Orobanchaceae commonly known as elephant's head, little pink elephant, elephantella, or similar common names inspired by the resemblance of the flower to the head of an elephant. It is also less commonly known as butterfly tongue for the long beak on the flower. Like many other plants in genus Pedicularis, it is a parasitic plant and depends on host plants to survive.

== Description ==
Pedicularis groenlandica is an erect plant that can grow to a height of 60 centimetres (24 in), but may be only 10 centimetres (3.9 in) tall. It generally has 5–20 larger leaves that sprout directly from the base of the plant (basal leaves). The leaves are narrow in outline with the widest part in the middle (blade lanceolate). The leaves have a pointed tip and are 20–150 millimeters long and 5–250 millimeters wide. They strongly resemble fern leaves being divided to the leaf central leaf vein, and sometimes the leaf segments being slightly divided again (1-pinnatifid or slightly 2-pinnatifid), with the leaf edges toothed or double toothed (serrate or doubly serrate). The surfaces of the leaves are smooth (glabrous). When the leaves first emerge in the spring they are distinctly red in color, but with lengthening days an increasing amount of green chlorophyll begins to mask most of the red pigments.

In addition to the basal leaves, Pedicularis groenlandica will have between 3 and 31 leaves attached the flowering stem (cauline leaves). These will also have the same blade lanceolate shape, but may be much smaller ranging in size from 10 to 150 millimeters in length and much narrower at just 1–25 millimeters in width. They also have the same feathery or fern like shape with serrate edges to the leaflets.

=== Flowers ===
The stem is topped with a large inflorescence of bright pink to purple or white flowers. Pedicularis groenlandica may flower between June and September, with flowering beginning at lower altitudes. The inflorescence is unbranched and will grow indeterminately (a raceme) and is always taller than the basal leaves. The dense flowering spike will measure between 4 and 15 centimeters, in exceptional cases reaching as much as 25 centimeters. Each plant will have either one or two flowering stems and each will have between 20 and 70 flowers. The bracts vary in shape from being long and thin like a blade of grass (linear) to being shaped like the blade of a trowel (trullate) and are located under the stems that attach the flowers to the main stem of the raceme (the pedicels). Each bract is 5–10 millimeters long and 2–10 millimeters wide with a smooth surface (glabrous) like the leaves and can be undivided or divided into a pinnatifid shape like the leaves. They also have a full range of edges from smooth to being double toothed.

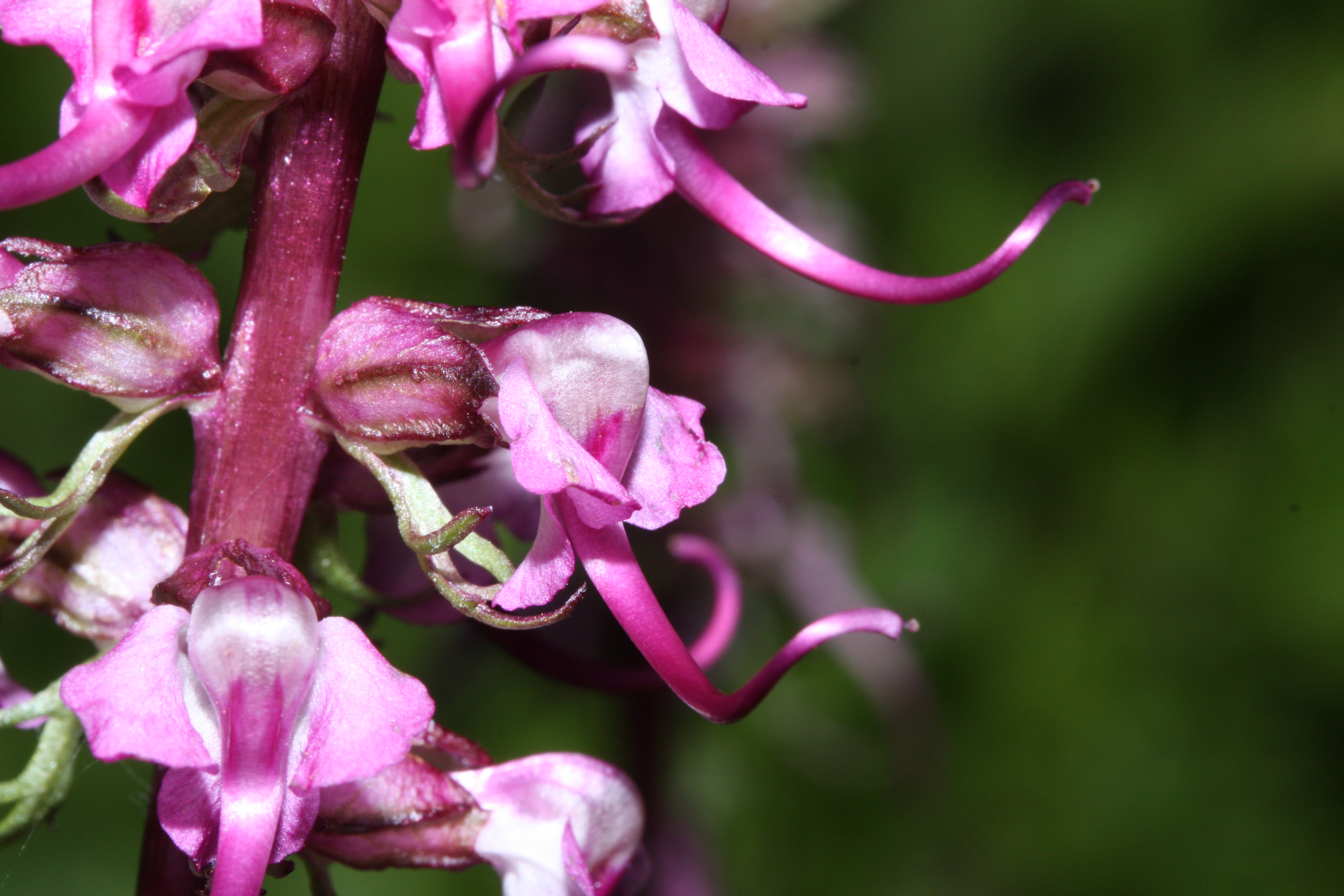
Detail of Pedicularis groenlandica flower

The pedicels attaching the flowers to the main stem are 0.5–1 millimeters and the flowers resemble a pink, reddish-purple, or purple (rarely white) head of an elephant to a remarkable extent. In addition to reflecting visible light, the petals of the flowers also reflect ultraviolet light. At the base of the flower, the fused sepals have five delta shaped lobes with either a smooth surface or fine, bristle-like hairs, and are 0.5–1.5 millimeters long. The petals (corolla) are 5–8 millimeters long, and usually have a purple tube of 3–5 millimeters. The forehead of the elephant is actually a structure that protects the pollen from the weather called a galea, and ranges in size from 1.5–3 millimeters, and extends into the long slightly coiled beak that resembles the elephant's trunk of 5–18 millimeters; the lateral lobes of the flower resemble an elephant's ears. This "remarkable resemblance" is often noted by both professional botanists and amateur wildflower enthusiasts.

The fruit of Pedicularis groenlandica is an asymmetrical capsule that is 6–14 millimeters in size. Within each are several 2.4–4 millimeter brown seeds which have a netted surface and small wings. The dried flower stems retain some of their elephantine appearance with the withered trunks being visible long after the flowers have faded.

The vegetative parts of Pedicularis groenlandica resemble the related species Pedicularis glabra, which has a range that extends into Mexico, and Pedicularis incurva, which grows in the Andes. Besides the habitat differences, it is the short stem attaching the flower to the main stem of the raceme and the long beak on the galea that serve to distinguish this species from others.

Like other louseworts and related broomrape genera, this is a root hemiparasite which obtains nutrients from the roots of other plants by piercing them with haustoria. Though Pedicularis species such as Pedicularis sylvatica, Pedicularis canadensis, and Pedicularis lanceolata can grow without host plants, Pedicularis groenlandica will decline and die without a host plant. The haustoria are fine side roots and are usually annual in Pedicularis groenlandica due to the contractile nature of the primary root system. The haustoria are generally only 1–3 millimeters in size.

== Taxonomy ==
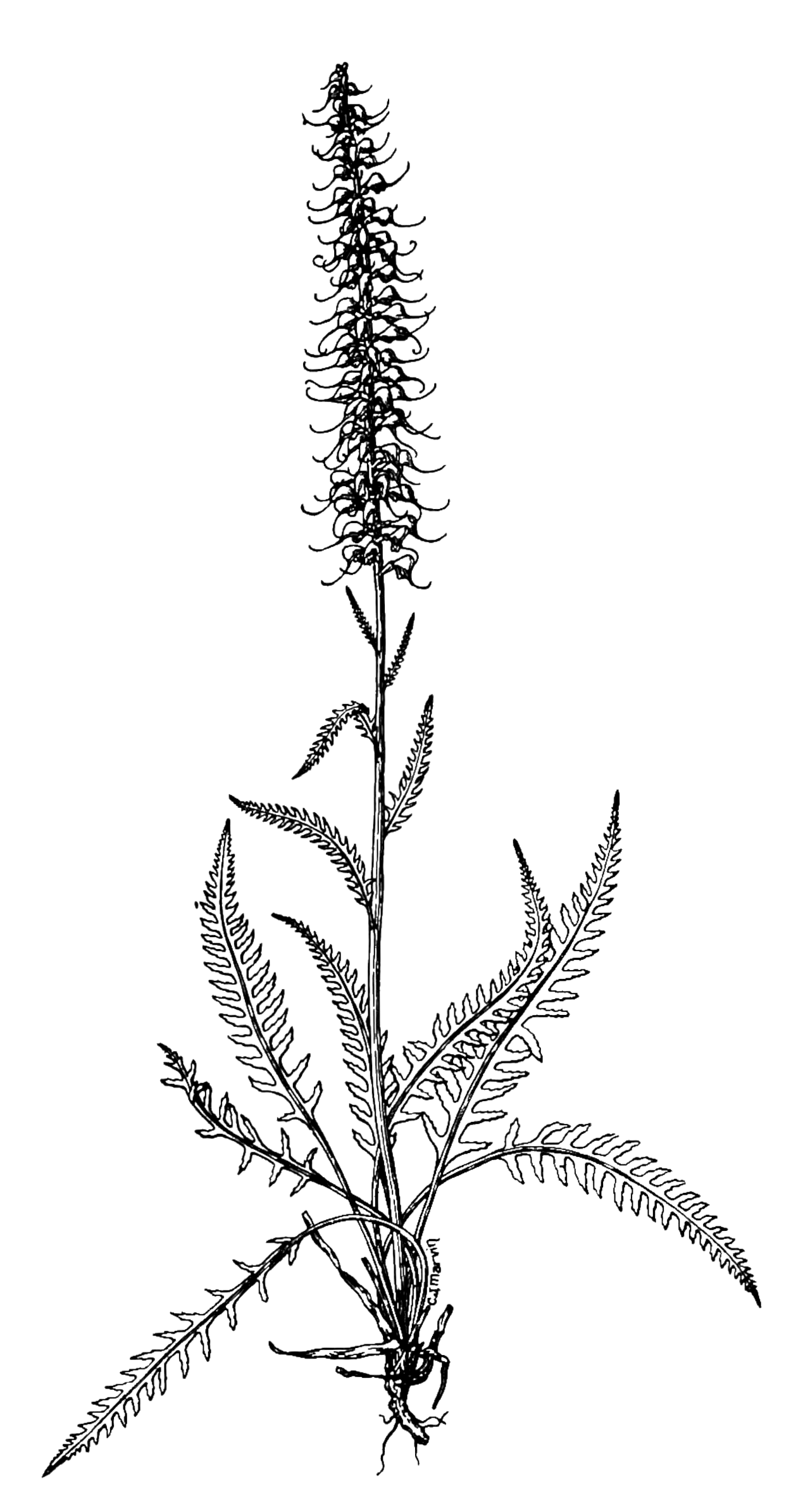
Pedicularis groenlandica illustrated by CJ Marvin, from Wild Flowers and Trees of Colorado, by Francis Ramaley, 1909

Pedicularis groenlandica was first described in 1795 by Anders Jahan Retzius in Florae Scandinaviae Prodromus. It was described from specimens collected in Greenland in the 1790s, but the location was lost until the 1940s when the type location was rediscovered.

In 1838 Pedicularis surrecta, was described and named by George Bentham in the book Flora Boreali-Americana. This "new" species was from "N. West Interior" of British America. Bentham thought there were some significant differences in the longer/larger hood protecting the pollen that made it a different species than well established Pedicularis groenlandica. Asa Gray published a description of Bentham's species as the variety Pedicularis groenlandica var. surrecta in 1872. As late as the 1930s and 1940s, some botanists continued to suspect that it could be its own species. The validity of even the subspecies was questioned by the mid-20th century, with Charles Leo Hitchcock writing in 1955, "...no clear-cut taxonomic segregation seems possible."

In 1900, the botanist Per Axel Rydberg placed Pedicularis groenlandica in a new genus with the name Elephantella groenlandica along with two other species. This found some support with other botanists. Harold Norman Moldenke published a new description of Pedicularis surrecta as Elephantella groenlandica var. surrecta as late as 1969, but this was one of the last uses of Elephantella as anything but as a synonym. In addition, throughout the time that Elephantella was used, the older classification as part of Pedicularis continued to be used by other botanists.

As of 2024, Plants of the World Online (POWO), World Flora Online (WFO), and the USDA Natural Resources Conservation Service PLANTS database (PLANTS) all list Pedicularis groenlandica as the correct classification with no valid subspecies.

=== Names ===
The genus name of Pedicularis is Latin for louse (pediculus). It was a folk belief that animals that ate lousewort would become infested with lice. The second part of its binomial name, "groenlandica", refers to its first scientific collection on the island of Greenland. Pedicularis groenlandica is known by many common names that are based on its appearance or taxonomy. The names "pink elephant's head", "elephant-head lousewort", "little pink elephant", "little red elephant", "bull elephant's-head", and "elephant's head" are in reference to the flower's "striking resemblance to an elephant's head." While Rydberg's creation of a new genus for the species did not withstand scientific scrutiny, the name "elephantella" has continued as a popular common name. Other common names like "butterfly-tongue lousewort" and "butterfly tongue" also make reference to the shape of the flower, but compare the extended beak to the long tongue of a butterfly instead.

== Habitat and distribution ==
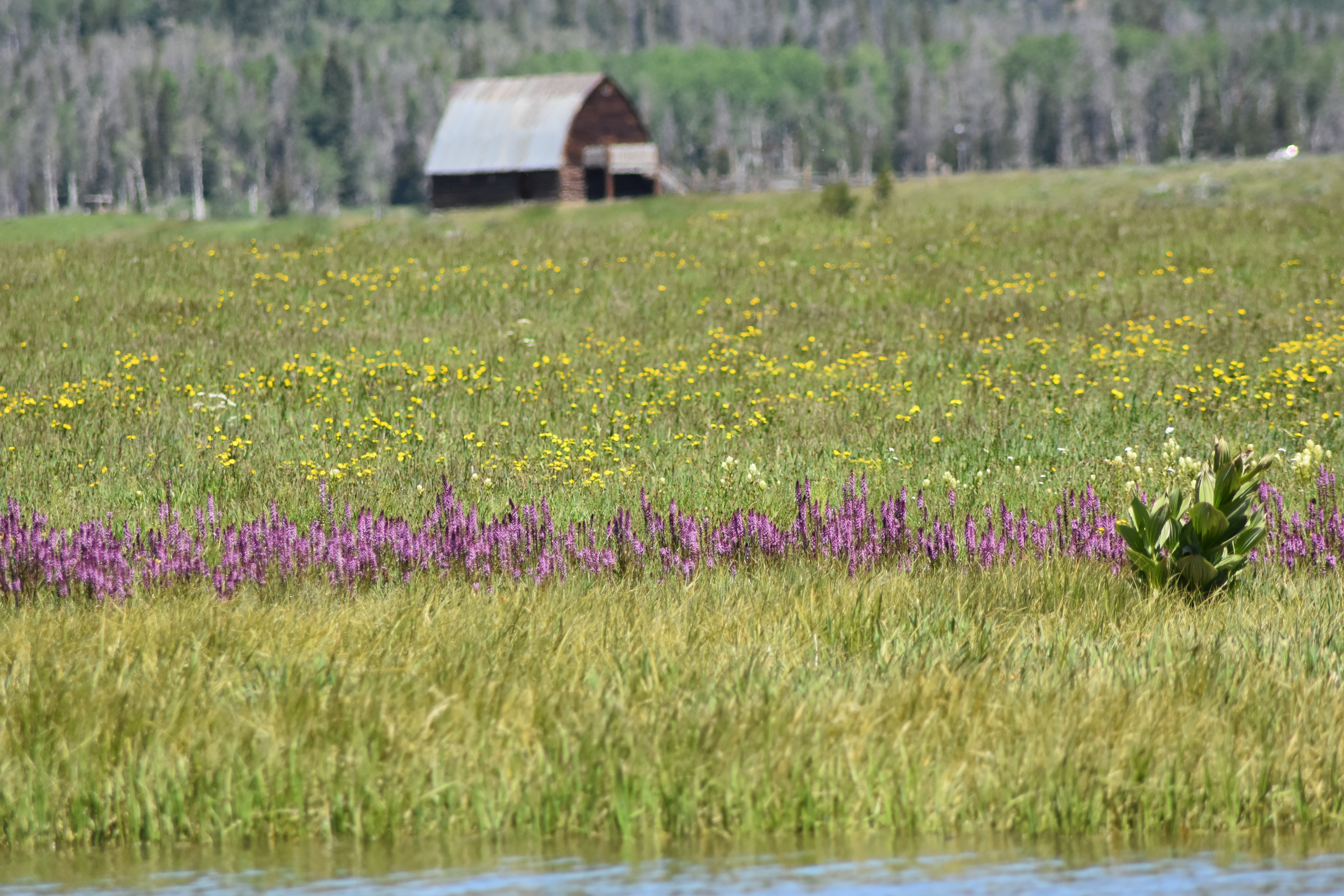
Pedicularis groenlandica growing between the shore of Steamboat Lake and the drier ground behind

Pedicularis groenlandica is the most widely distributed member of the genus Pedicularis in North America. This plant is found in the high mountain ranges of western North America, including the Cascades, High Sierra, Rocky Mountains, western Canada, and Alaska. It also extends its range eastward through Canada and into Greenland. In Greenland, it is only found in a single location, the same place it was originally discovered growing near Nuuk in the Eqaluit commune's Paarliit Kuussuat (Paarliit Valley) at 64°01'N. The altitude range of the species is from 600 to 3500 meters in elevation.

Pedicularis groenlandica requires a cold montane, alpine tundra, boreal, or arctic tundra climate. Within these environments it strongly prefers moist habitats such as bogs, fens, marshes, forested swamps, springs, stream banks, and floodplains. In Greenland, the plant grows amid Carex bigelowii near a river bank. In the Elk Mountains of central Colorado, it was found as part of a survey of vascular plants; it grows immediately adjacent to six glacially-derived ponds and in wet meadows. Similarly, when observed in Labrador's Mealy Mountains east of Goose Bay, the plants were found growing along a lake shore and in marshy areas. It was only found in the southern part of the Yukon Territory, in the same boggy habitat of the Watson Lake area.

=== Conservation ===
In 2015, the International Union for Conservation of Nature assessed Pedicularis groenlandica for the IUCN Red List as least concern. They found that the plant is widespread and not close to meeting the threshold for vulnerable. Likewise, it was evaluated by NatureServe as globally secure (G5) in 2016. They evaluated populations in Alberta, British Columbia, and Ontario as secure (S5), with Montana, Quebec, and Wyoming as apparently secure (S4). Populations in Labrador, Nunavut, and Manitoba were found to be vulnerable (S3), and imperiled (S2) in the Yukon, Alaska, and Saskatchewan. The only area assessed as critically imperiled (S1) at that time was Newfoundland. They have not yet evaluated the rest of the natural range of the species.

== Ecology ==
Unlike Pedicularis bracteosa, Pedicularis procera, or Pedicularis sudetica, Pedicularis groenlandica lacks a nectar reward for pollinators. Bees visit the flowers to gather pollen and other plants for nectar rewards. Bumblebees (genus Bombus) vibrate their flight muscles while holding onto the flower to release the concealed pollen. In Colorado, three species of bumblebee workers—Bombus bifarius, Bombus melanopygus, and Bombus sylvicola—were observed visiting P. groenlandica most often. In addition, queens or workers of five other species—Bombus appositus, Bombus centralis, Bombus flavifrons, Bombus mixtus, and Bombus occidentalis—were recorded at lower frequencies of visitation. Pollinator exclusion experiments show that the flowers are not self-fertile with no fruit set on plants without pollinator access.

Pedicularis groenlandica is relatively non-specific in host requirements. It has been documented parasitizing various Carex species (sedges) and Poa species (grasses), specifically Carex helleri, Carex fissuricola, Carex nigricans and also the grass Deschampsia cespitosa. Contact of the plant's roots with that of a host plant stimulates the production of haustoria to tap the host plant.

The butterfly Euphydryas gillettii has been observed laying its eggs on Pedicularis groenlandica colonies in Idaho. Captive experiments show no significant differences in survivorship of caterpillars feeding on its leaves in comparison with its more common host plant, Lonicera involucrata.

== Cultivation ==
Pedicularis groenlandica and other species in its genus are rarely cultivated. Live plants are not offered for commercial sale due to the difficulties in growing host-dependent parasitic plants. Most, but not all Pedicularis species are completely dependent on host species. Seeds are available commercially, as it is sometimes propagated for wetland restoration efforts in its native range. In a 2002 report, the seeds were said to be non-dormant and to sprout at 22 °C (72 °F). Later work by Jeff Evans and Dale Wick found that while a host plant is not required for the seeds to sprout, they will decline in health and eventually die without a host. Evans and Wick list the seeds as having physiological dormancy and use gibberellic acid to enhance germination. In the wild the dormancy may be broken by warm cool warm cycles. Gardens with very wet, nearly boggy, areas may grow P. groenlandica, particularly with black alpine sedge (Carex nigricans), one of its most frequent host plants.

Pedicularis groenlandica
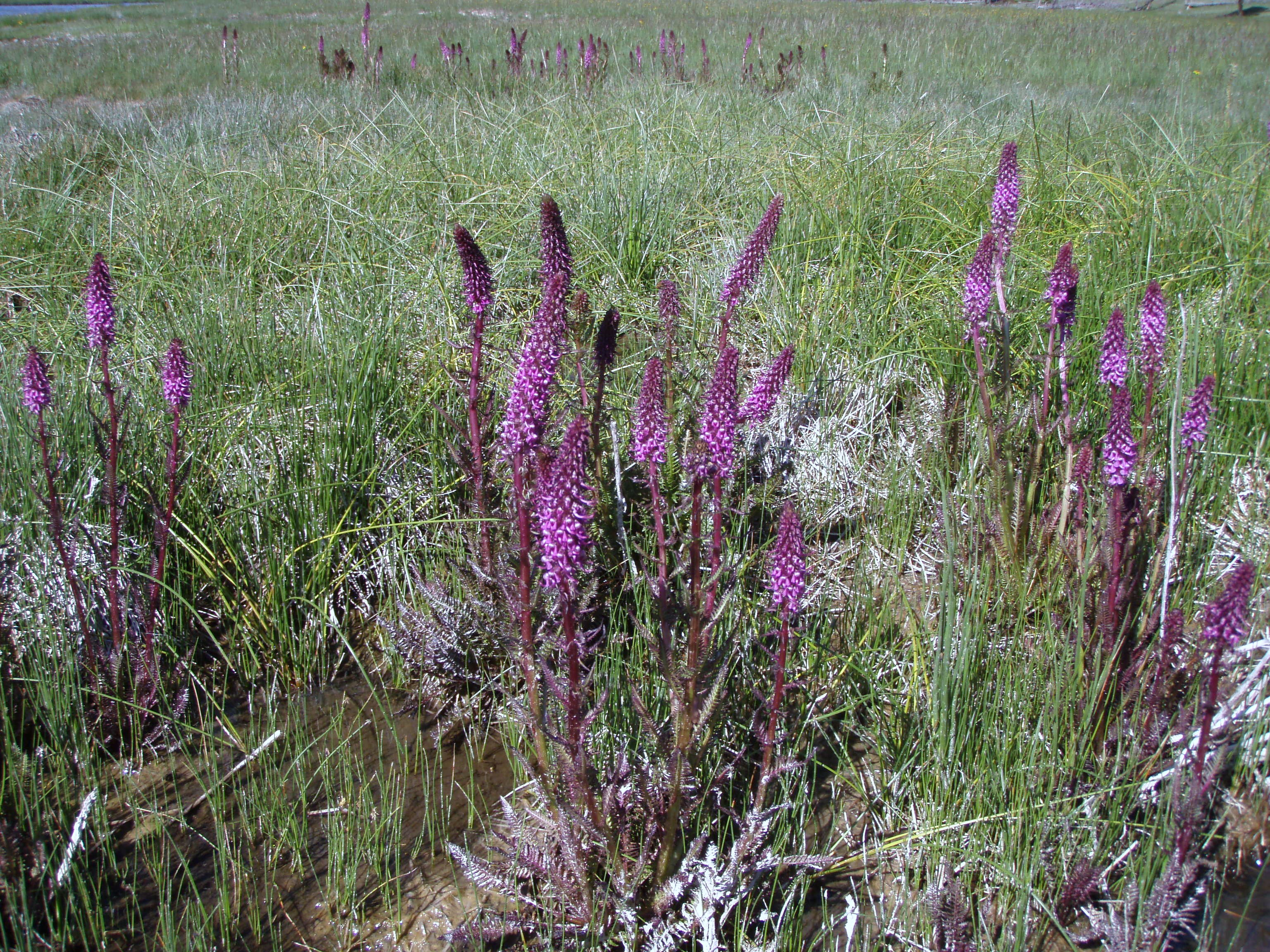
Colony along Firehole River, Yellowstone National Park

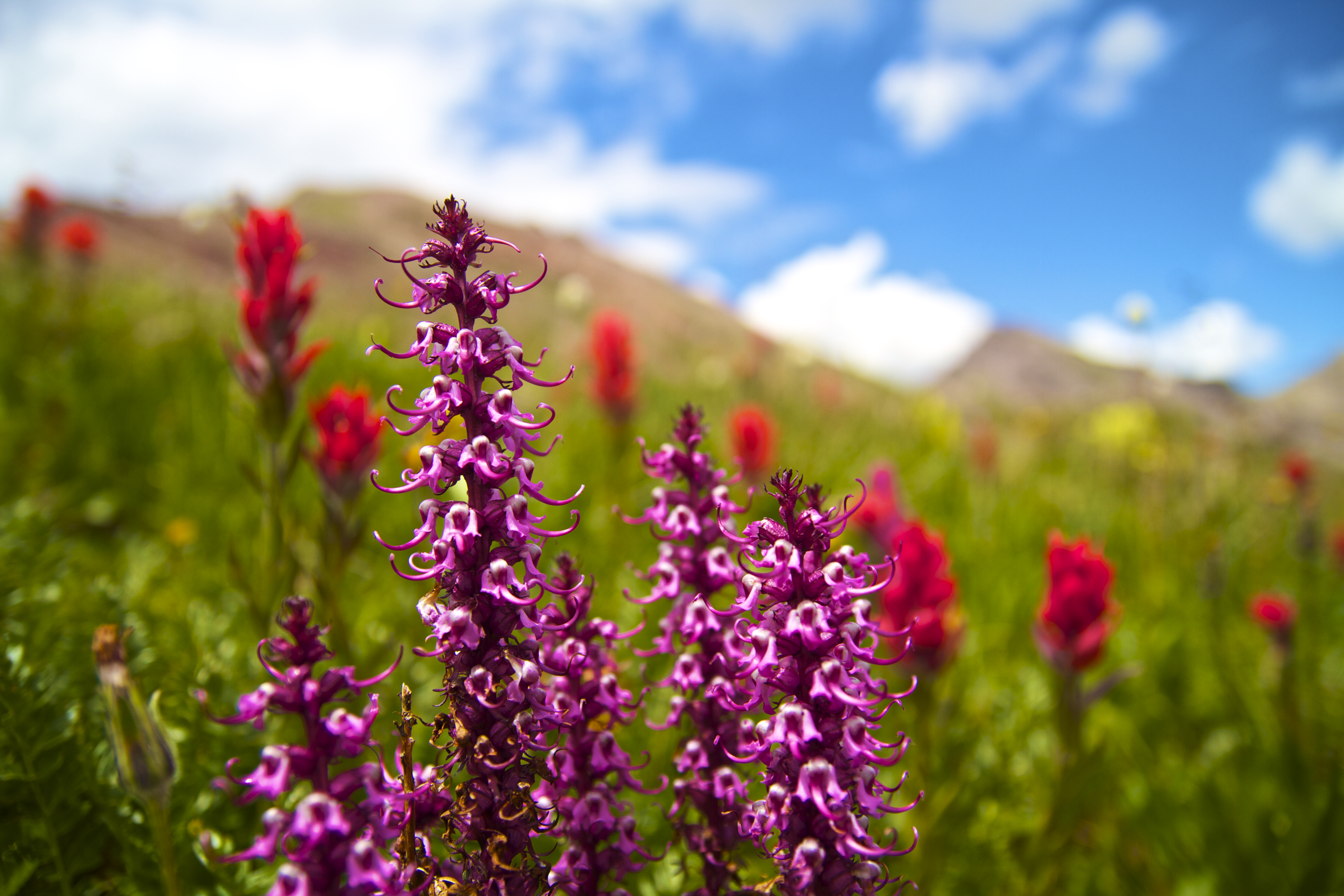
Maroon Bells–Snowmass Wilderness, Colorado

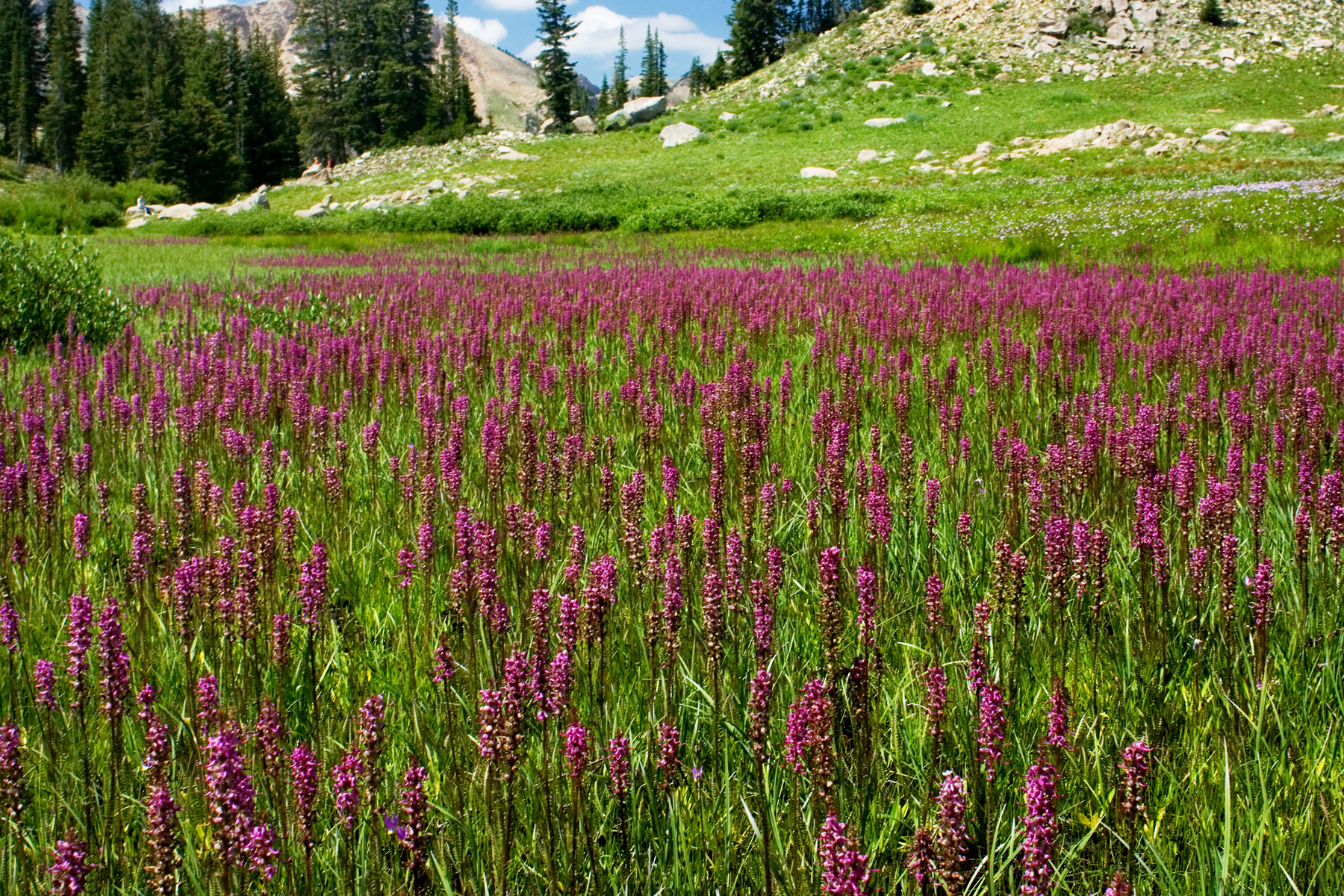
Catherine Pass Trail, Wasatch Range, Utah

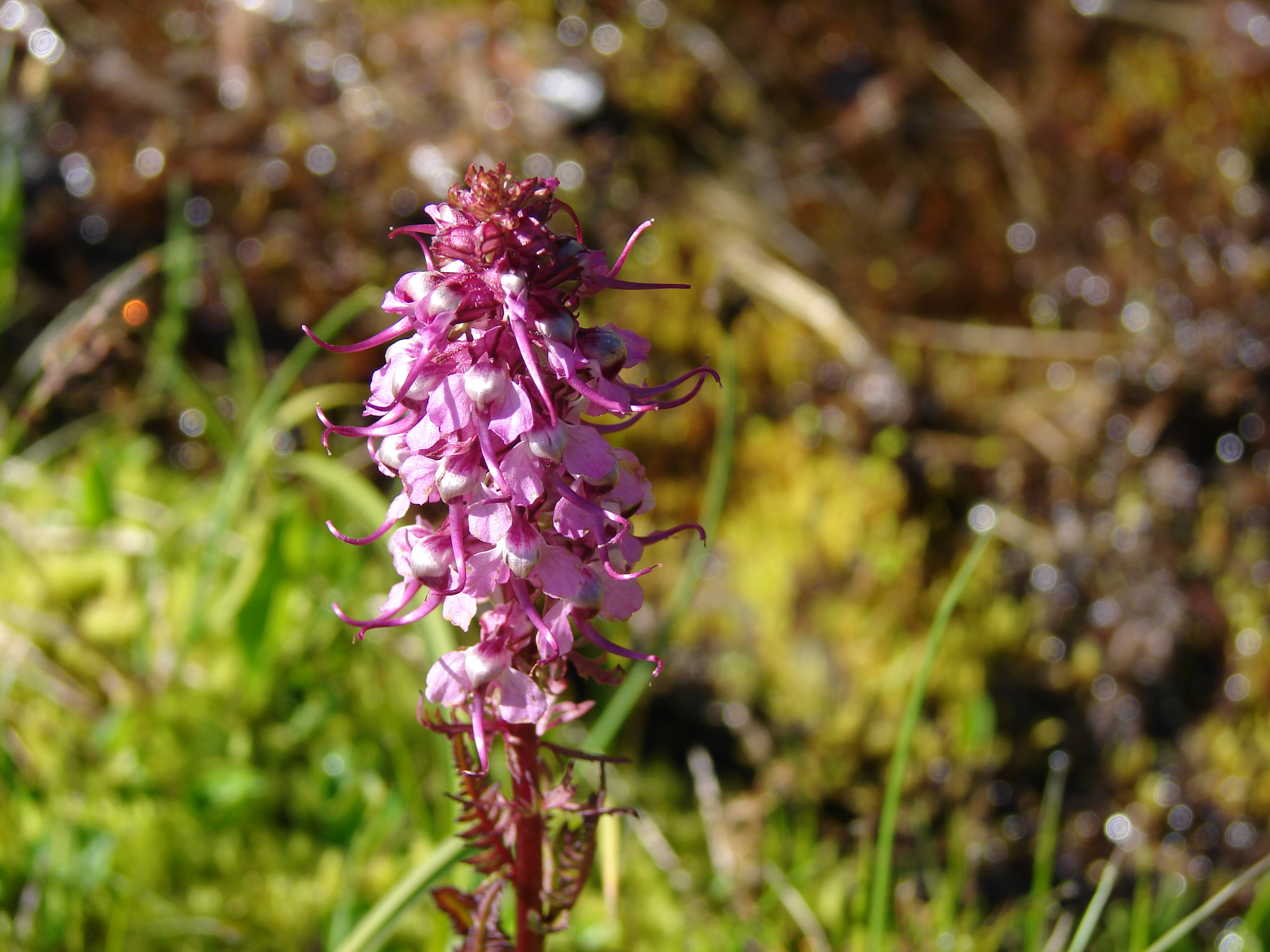
Mount Rainier National Park, Washington (State)

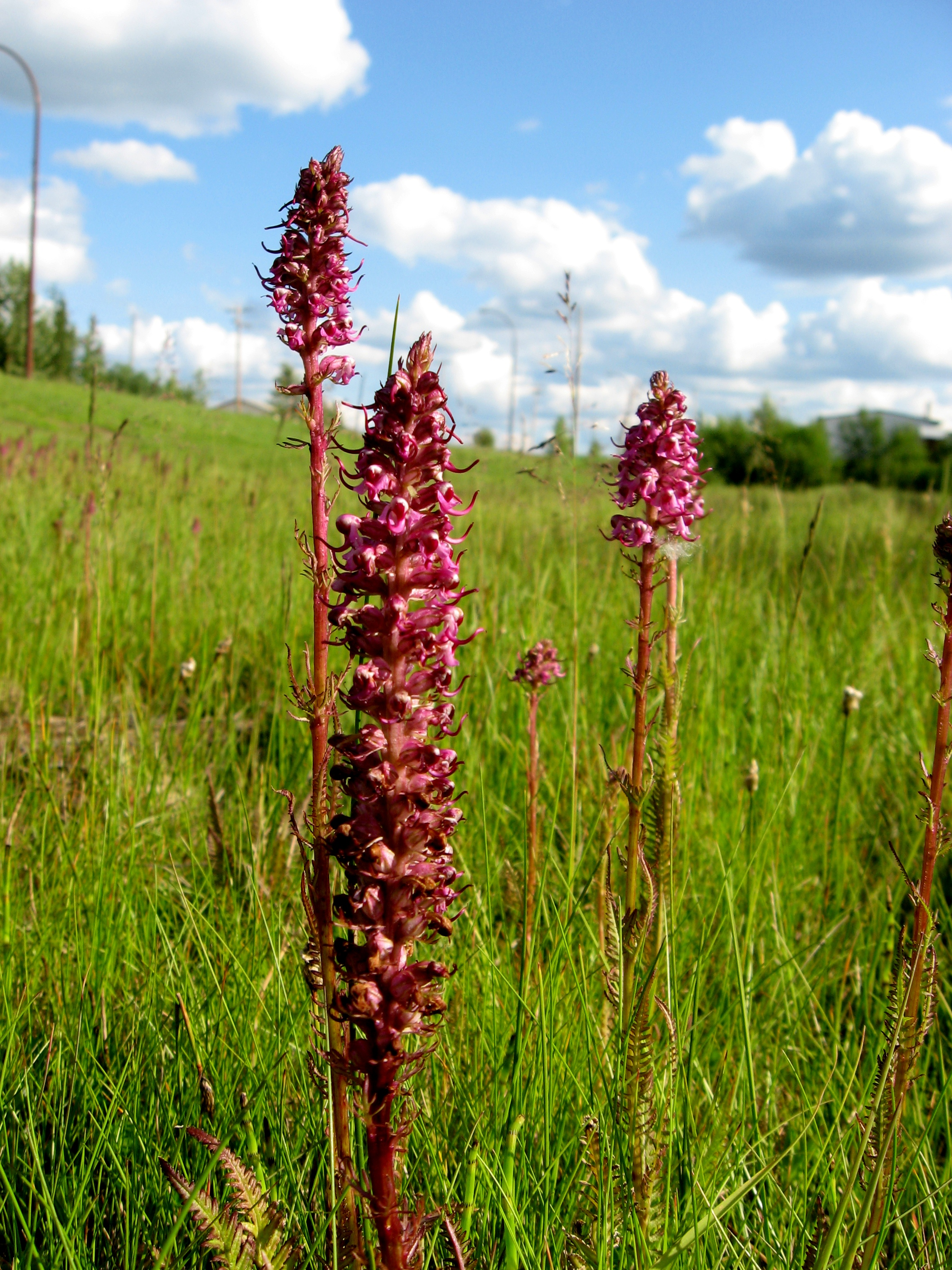
North-central Alberta, Canada

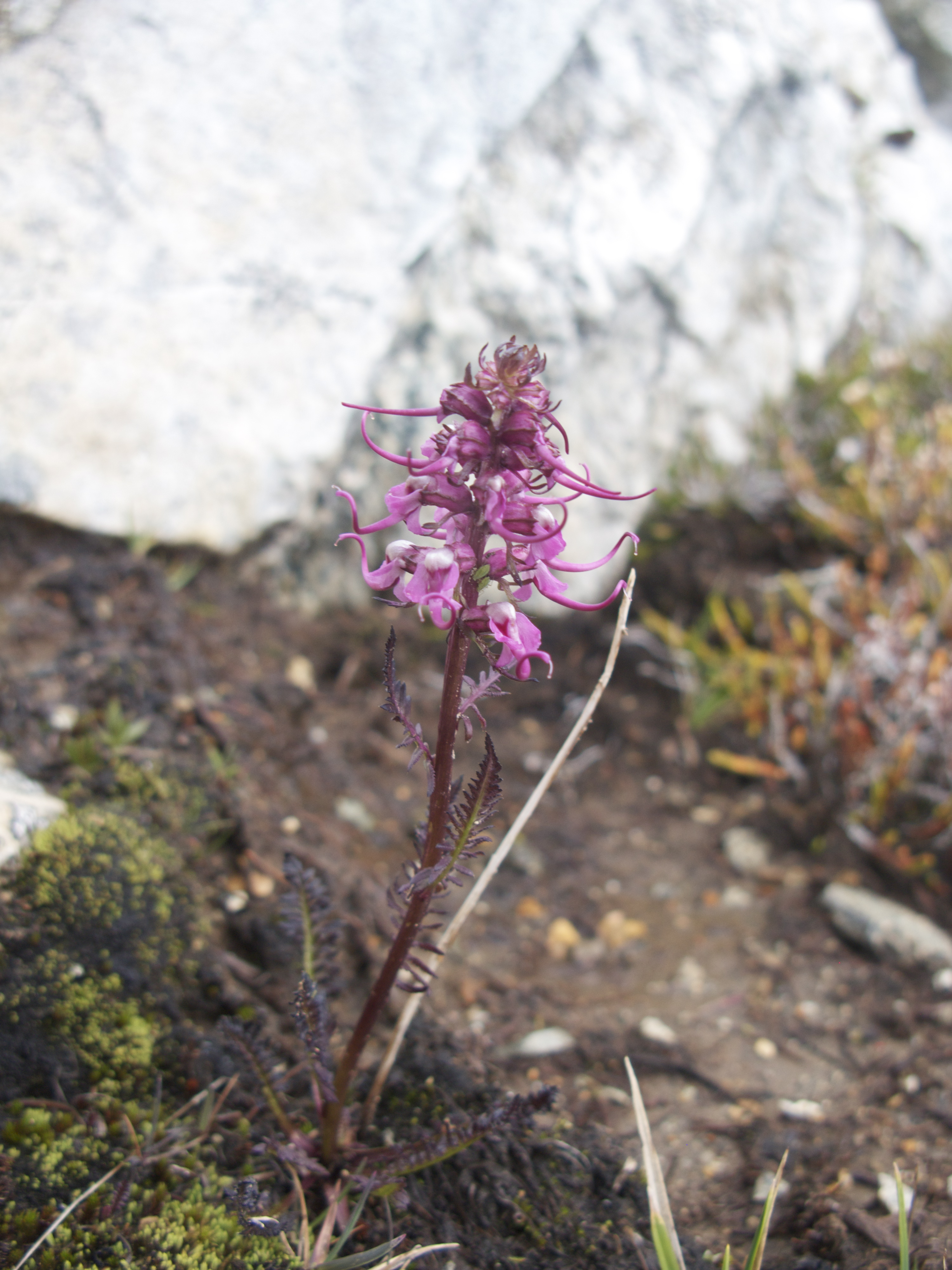
Leroy Basin, Washington (State)

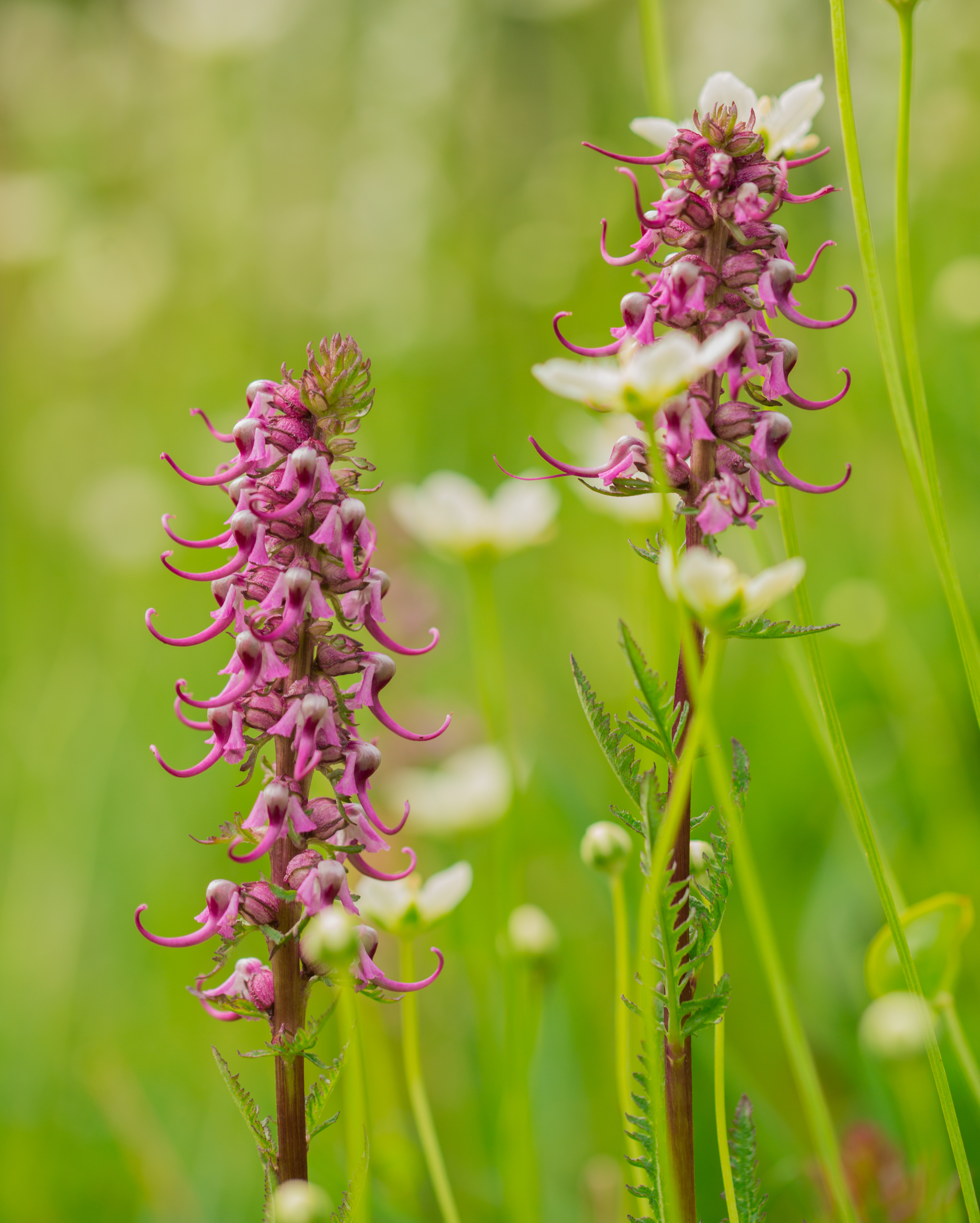
