= Black alpine sedge =

Black alpine sedge is a common name for several plants and may refer to:

- Carex atrata, native to Greenland, Europe and parts of temperate Asia
- Carex nigricans, native to western North America
