= Bombus incognitus =

Proposed species of bumblebee

"Bombus incognitus" is a name proposed for a species of bumblebee mostly found in North America. It was first found in the Rocky Mountains by researchers from Uppsala University. Prior to its discovery, it was confused with Bombus sylvicola due to their external similarities. It was discovered the bees represented a separate species by comparison of gene sequences. The name "incognitus" was proposed for the animals because of their confusion with sylvicola. However, the name was not validly published under the rules of the ICZN (no formal description, no type specimen), and is therefore not an available species name, and as of 2022, this species still does not have a name or formal description.
