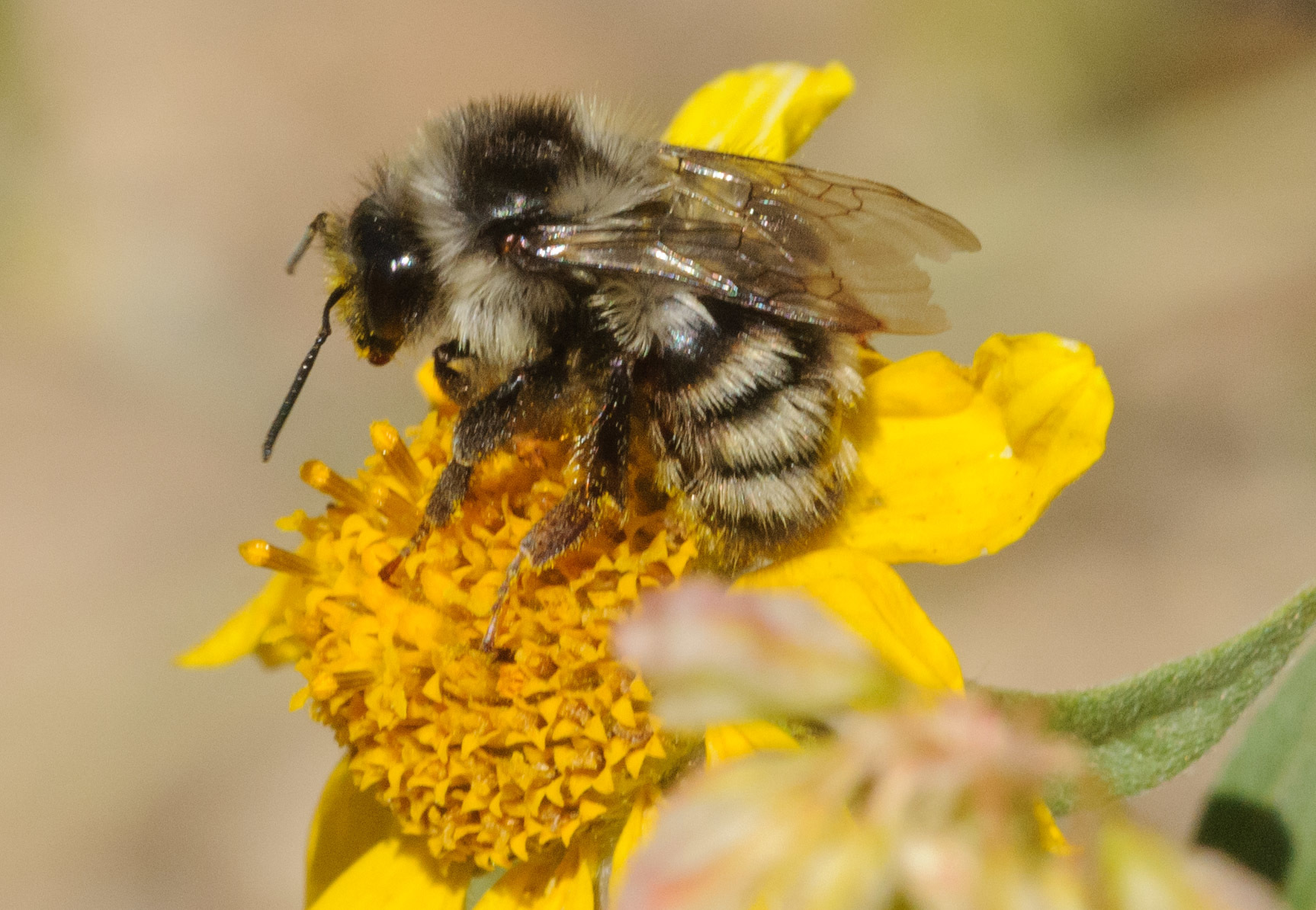
- B. v. nearcticus, Utah

Scientific classification
- Kingdom: Animalia
- Phylum: Arthropoda
- Clade: Pancrustacea
- Class: Insecta
- Order: Hymenoptera
- Family: Apidae
- Genus: Bombus
- Subgenus: Pyrobombus
- Species: B. vancouverensis

Binomial name
- Bombus vancouverensis Cresson, 1878

= Bombus vancouverensis =

- B. v. vancouverensis, Vancouver Island, BC

Species of bee

Bombus vancouverensis, the Vancouver bumblebee, is a common species of eusocial bumblebee of the subgenus Pyrobombus. B. vancouverensis inhabits mountainous regions of western North America, where it has long been considered as a synonym of Bombus bifarius, and essentially all of the literature on bifarius refers instead to vancouverensis. B. vancouverensis has been identified as one of the two species of bumblebee observed to use pheromones in kin recognition. The other is the frigid bumblebee, Bombus frigidus.

== Taxonomy ==
Bombus vancouverensis has two recognized subspecies:

- Bombus vancouverensis vancouverensis Cresson, 1878 (the Vancouver Island Bumblebee) - limited to British Columbia
- Bombus vancouverensis nearcticus Handlirsch, 1888 (the Nearctic Bumblebee) - widespread in the United States and Canada

Bombus vancouverensis was first described by Ezra Townsend Cresson in the 1878 Proceedings of the Academy of Natural Sciences of Philadelphia. It is a member of the order Hymenoptera and the family Apidae, which also includes orchid bees, honey bees, and bumblebees. A subspecies, originally named Bombus nearcticus, was named in 1888. B. vancouverensis expresses varying color forms, with the two most observed being a red-tailed "bifarius" form and a black-tailed nearcticus form, historically both considered to belong to the related species Bombus bifarius. Individuals showing the red-tailed and black-tailed forms can both be found from Utah and Wyoming north to western Canada, Alaska, California, Oregon, Idaho, Montana, and Washington, though the black-tailed form is generally far more common. Because of differences in genetic structuring between these populations in various geographic locations, there had been debate as early as 2013 suggesting these two major color pattern polymorphisms might represent more than one biological species. As of 2020, the genetic differentiation between bifarius and vancouverensis has been confirmed and characterized, with true bifarius being exclusively red-tailed and much more geographically-restricted, while vancouverensis is polymorphic and very widely distributed.

== Description and identification ==
Bombus vancouverensis has a relatively small body size ranging from 8 to 14 mm (0.31 to 0.55 in) for workers and 15 to 19 mm (0.59 to 0.75 in) for queens, with short, even hair covering their bodies. B. vancouverensis individuals express multiple color forms; however, many similarities exist between these color variants. Hair on the faces of B. vancouverensis individuals is usually yellow or white in color and sometimes exhibits black coloration on the top of the head. In at least the lowermost third of the thorax, there is also black coloration. The hindlegs and pollen baskets can be a brownish-orange or black, depending on whether metasomal tergite (abdominal segment) 3 is black or not. In the red-tailed color variant, metasomal tergites 2 and 3 are red, while in the black-tailed color variant, metasomal tergites 2 and 3 are black.

=== Sexual dimorphism ===
Males are similar in size to female workers, ranging from 8 to 13 mm (0.31 to 0.51 in). Their eyes are also similar in size and shape to those of their female counterparts. Colorations on their bodies are similar to those of workers and the queen; however, T3 and T6 are most frequently black in males and can vary between black, red, and yellow in workers and queens.

=== Nests ===
Bombus vancouverensis nests are made underground or on the surface of the ground. These nests are often small and are made up of one singular open chamber. B. vancouverensis can also make their nests in abandoned rodent nests.

=== Diet ===
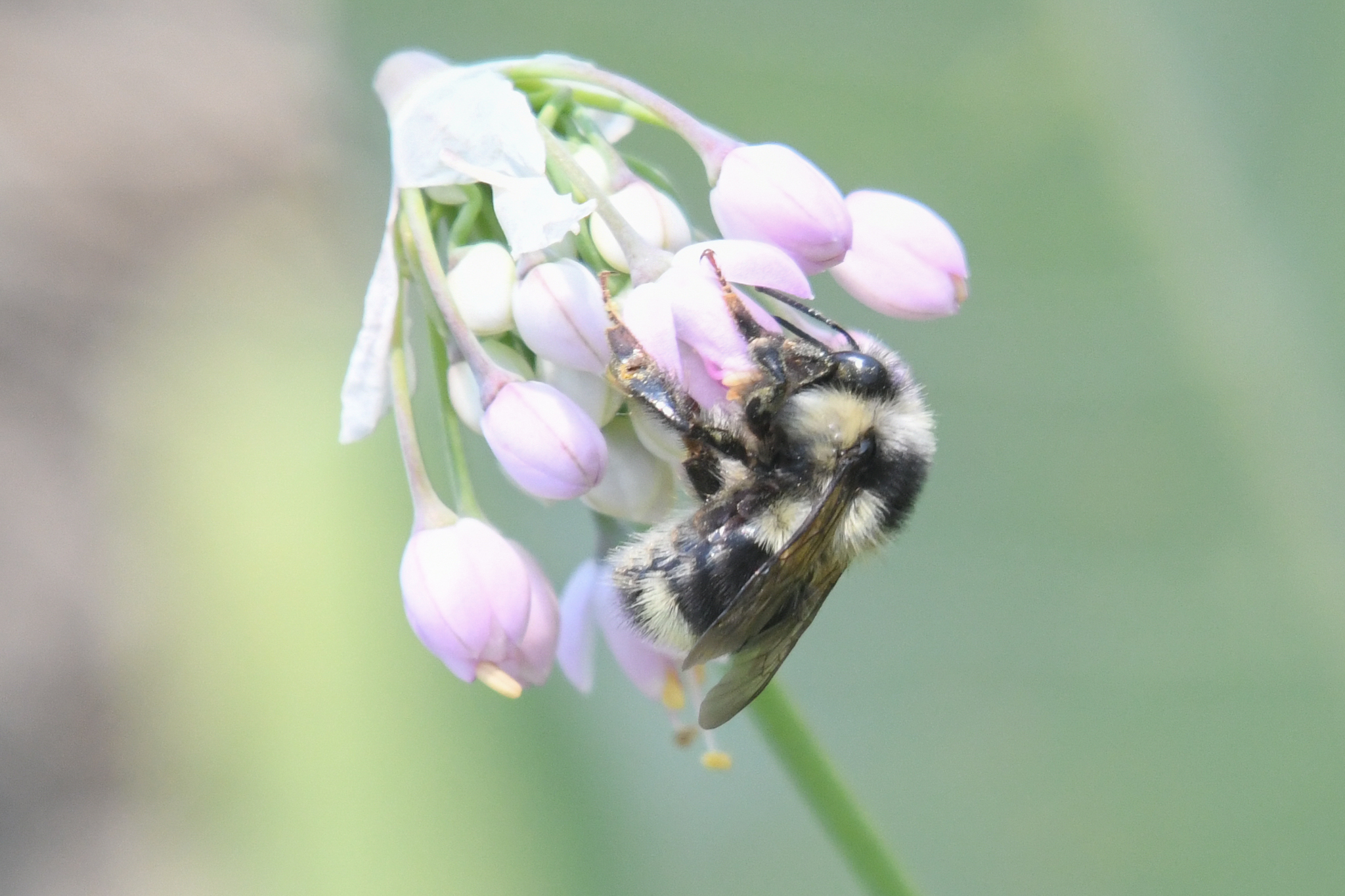
Bombus vancouverensis feeding on Allium cernuum

Bombus vancouverensis forages for pollen and nectar from the following plants: Aster, Centaurea, Chrysothamnus, Cirsium, Epilobium, Ericameria, Haplopappus, Helenium, Lupinus, Melilotus, Monardella, Penstemon, Ribes, Senecio, Solidago, and Symphoricarpos.

== Distribution and habitat ==
Bombus vancouverensis is found across mountainous regions of western North America. In the United States, it has been found in parts of Alaska, California, Idaho, Montana, Nevada, Oregon, South Dakota, Utah, Washington, and Wyoming. In Canada, it has been found in Alberta, British Columbia, Manitoba, the Northwest Territories, Saskatchewan, and Yukon. B. vancouverensis makes its home in various habitats, including open grassy fields, parks, prairies, shrubs, and mountainous areas.

== Colony cycle ==
Colonies regenerate annually, with queens emerging from hibernation in the early spring to found one colony per queen. After emerging, queens produce the first wave of workers, initiating the eusocial phase. In the eusocial phase, exponential growth of the colony occurs and workers help queens expand the size of the colony. Eventually, the eusocial phase gives way to the reproductive phase, in which the offspring produced are sexual offspring. These offspring then leave the nest and mate with non-nestmates, and young queens that have been inseminated enter hibernation until the following spring when they found their new colony.

== Behavior ==
=== Mating ===
Bombus vancouverensis queens only mate once during the colony cycle, preferably with a non-related male. Often, the duration of mating interactions between males and B. vancouverensis queens are long, lasting up to forty-five minutes.

==== Kin recognition and inbreeding avoidance ====
Bombus vancouverensis and B. frigidus prefer to mate with non-nestmates, so they have evolved a number of strategies to determine which individuals are kin and which are not. For example, environmental cues like proximity to the nest may indicate that a reproductive female is related. However, not all encounters fall under the category of environmental cues; B. vancouverensis is one of the few bumblebee species that can also determine kin using individually-borne methods. For example, males exhibit a behavior called "patrolling", in which they mark specific paths with pheromones and "patrol" these paths hoping to encounter a reproductive female that was attracted to the scent. Reproductive females are able to sense these pheromones and are attracted to them.

==== Mate guarding ====
Bombus vancouverensis males often compete for access to females, which has caused them to evolve strategies to ensure that they successfully complete the mating process with a chosen queen. That mating interactions are prolonged indicates that males "guard" their mate to ensure other males cannot copulate with her. This behavior is costly, however, since prolonged mating with one queen means that males overall engage in fewer mating interactions. Additionally, mate guarding immobilizes the mating pair, making them more susceptible to predatory attacks.

=== Thermoregulation in the nest ===
Keeping the nest environment at an optimal temperature is a crucial aspect of survival, especially for developing brood. Studies have shown that B. vancouverensis workers are capable of regulating nest temperature; they do this in a number of ways, namely by changing the rates at which they perform specific behaviors of wing fanning and brood cell incubation. During wing fanning, individuals flap their wings quickly as a means of cooling down their surroundings. Brood incubation involves a coiling of the worker's body around a brood cell and contracting her muscles so as to transfer heat to her surroundings. Broadly, as the temperature of the nest increases, the rate of brood cell incubation decreases and wing fanning behaviors increase within the nest. However, these behaviors are not universally exhibited by individuals at the same temperatures; some individuals begin incubating at higher temperatures than others, and some begin fanning their wings at lower temperatures than others.

=== Foraging ===
Studies have shown that B. vancouverensis forage in random directions when foraging for pollen and nectar. These bees have mechanisms by which they can recognize which flowers they have already visited. The mechanism appears to be one by which the bee sees open flowers and senses how much pollen is still available in them. Their ultimate strategy for pollen foraging, whether it be through area-restricted searching behavior or moving between flowers near them regardless of quality of bloom, is variable depending on the conditions under which B. vancouverensis is foraging. For example, in P. gracilis blooms, the quality of bloom can be assessed by B. vancouverensis at relatively low cost to the individual, so moving to nearby neighboring flowers instead of area-restricted searching yields more energy intake per energy input.

==== Buzz pollination ====
Bombus vancouverensis, like many other bumblebees, gathers pollen from flowers in a process called buzz pollination. During buzz pollination, the bee "sonicates" the anthers of the flowers, thereby shaking the pollen from the anthers to be collected in the individual's pollen sacs. Because of their small size, B. vancouverensis individuals are known to hang upside-down on the flower when engaging in buzz pollination.

==== Nectar foraging ====
Bombus vancouverensis workers have short proboscides (tongue-like structures), which makes nectar foraging more difficult for them relative to bumblebees with longer proboscides. Therefore, in order to effectively retrieve nectar from plants, B. vancouverensis individuals often use their short proboscides to lick along the back of nectar ducts of the plant in question. This yields a smaller reward than the rewards obtained with larger proboscides, but not small enough to make nectar foraging ineffective.

==== Foraging task specialization ====
Most workers of B. vancouverensis forage for both nectar and pollen; however, there has been evidence of specialization within foragers, with some collecting only nectar and others collecting only pollen throughout their whole careers as foragers. Studies have shown that foragers that specialize in collecting either nectar or pollen are able to gather more food than those that did not specialize.
