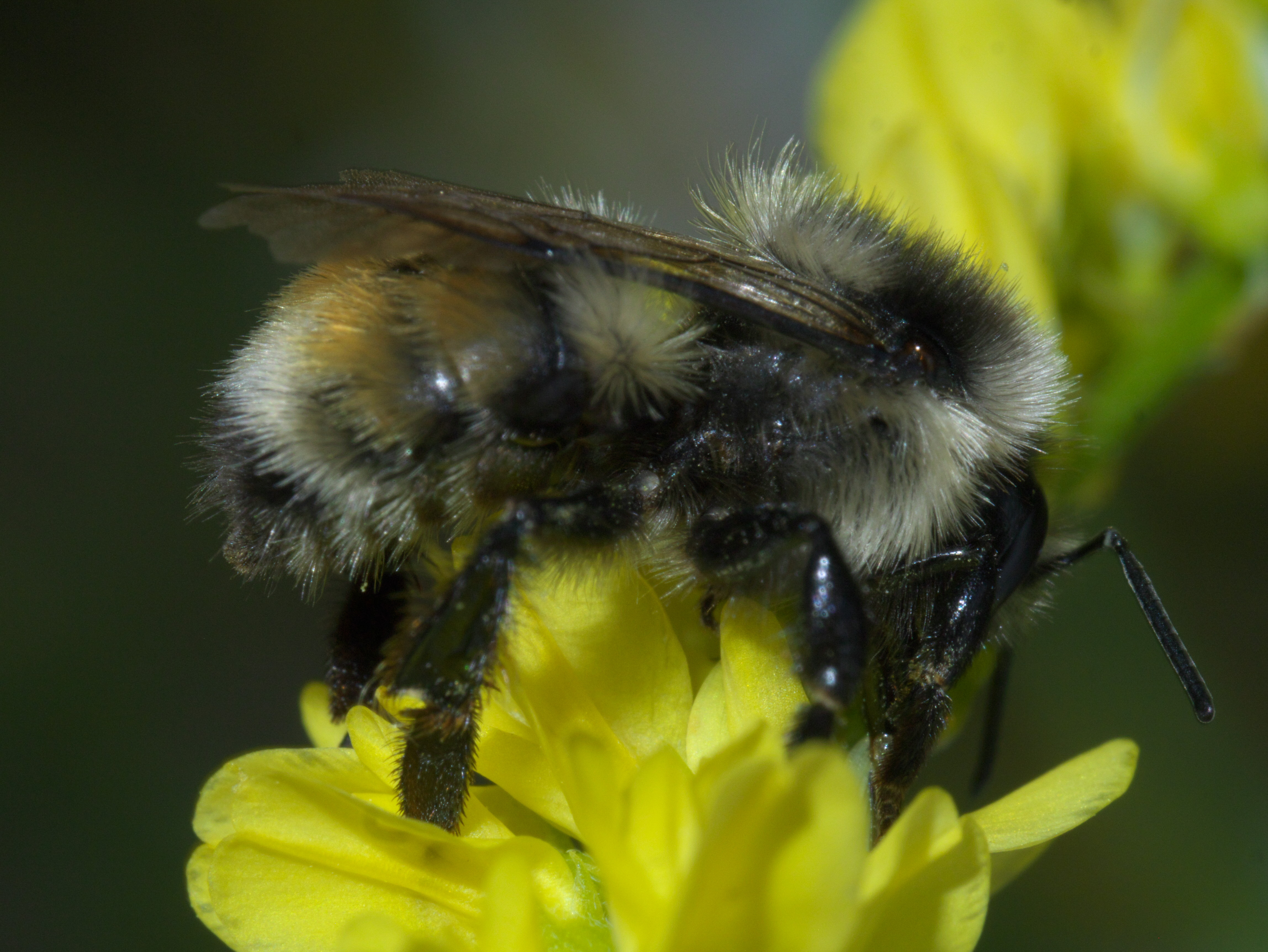

Conservation status
- Least Concern (IUCN 3.1)

Scientific classification
- Kingdom: Animalia
- Phylum: Arthropoda
- Class: Insecta
- Order: Hymenoptera
- Family: Apidae
- Genus: Bombus
- Subgenus: Pyrobombus
- Species: B. bifarius

Binomial name
- Bombus bifarius Cresson, 1878

= Bombus bifarius =

Species of bee

Bombus bifarius, the two-form bumblebee, is a species of eusocial bumblebee of the subgenus Pyrobombus. B. bifarius inhabits mountainous regions of western North America, primarily the states of Colorado and Utah. Its common name refers to a historical artifact, in that it was believed that this species had a color polymorphism, with a red-tailed nominate form and a black-tailed nearcticus form present in the species. This polymorphism has recently been shown to belong instead to a cryptic sister species, Bombus vancouverensis, that occupies almost the entirety of the range of what was formerly classified as bifarius; true bifarius only has a red form, so it is not "two-formed" at all.

== Taxonomy and phylogeny ==
Bombus bifarius was first described by Ezra Townsend Cresson in the 1878 Proceedings of the Academy of Natural Sciences of Philadelphia. It is a member of the order Hymenoptera and the family Apidae, which also includes orchid bees, honey bees, and bumblebees. It was long believed that B. bifarius expressed varying color patterns, with the two most observed being the nominate and nearcticus color patterns. Red-tailed specimens classified as B. bifarius are found from Colorado all the way north to British Columbia, but have been found to comprise two different species (bifarius and Bombus vancouverensis) while the nearcticus color pattern (primarily found in western Canada, Alaska, California, Oregon, Idaho, Montana, and Washington) belongs to vancouverensis and not to bifarius. Because of differences in genetic structuring between these populations in various geographic locations, there had been debate as early as 2013 suggesting these two major color pattern polymorphisms might represent more than one biological species. As of 2020, the genetic differentiation between bifarius and vancouverensis has been confirmed and characterized.

== Description and identification ==
Bombus bifarius has a relatively small body size ranging from 8 to 14 mm (0.31 to 0.55 in) for workers and 15 to 19 mm (0.59 to 0.75 in) for queens, with short, even hair covering their bodies. Hair on the faces of B. bifarius individuals is usually yellow or white in color and sometimes exhibits black coloration on the top of the head. In at least the lowermost third of the thorax, there is also black coloration. The hindlegs and pollen baskets are brownish-orange, and the hairs on metasomal tergites 2 and 3 are red.

=== Sexual dimorphism ===
Males are similar in size to female workers, ranging from 8 to 13 mm (0.31 to 0.51 in). Their eyes are also similar in size and shape to those of their female counterparts. Colorations on their bodies are similar to those of workers and the queens.

== Distribution ==
Bombus bifarius is found in mountainous regions of western North America, limited to northern Arizona, Colorado, northern New Mexico, Utah, and southern Wyoming; populations from all other areas formerly classified as bifarius belong instead to B. vancouverensis.
