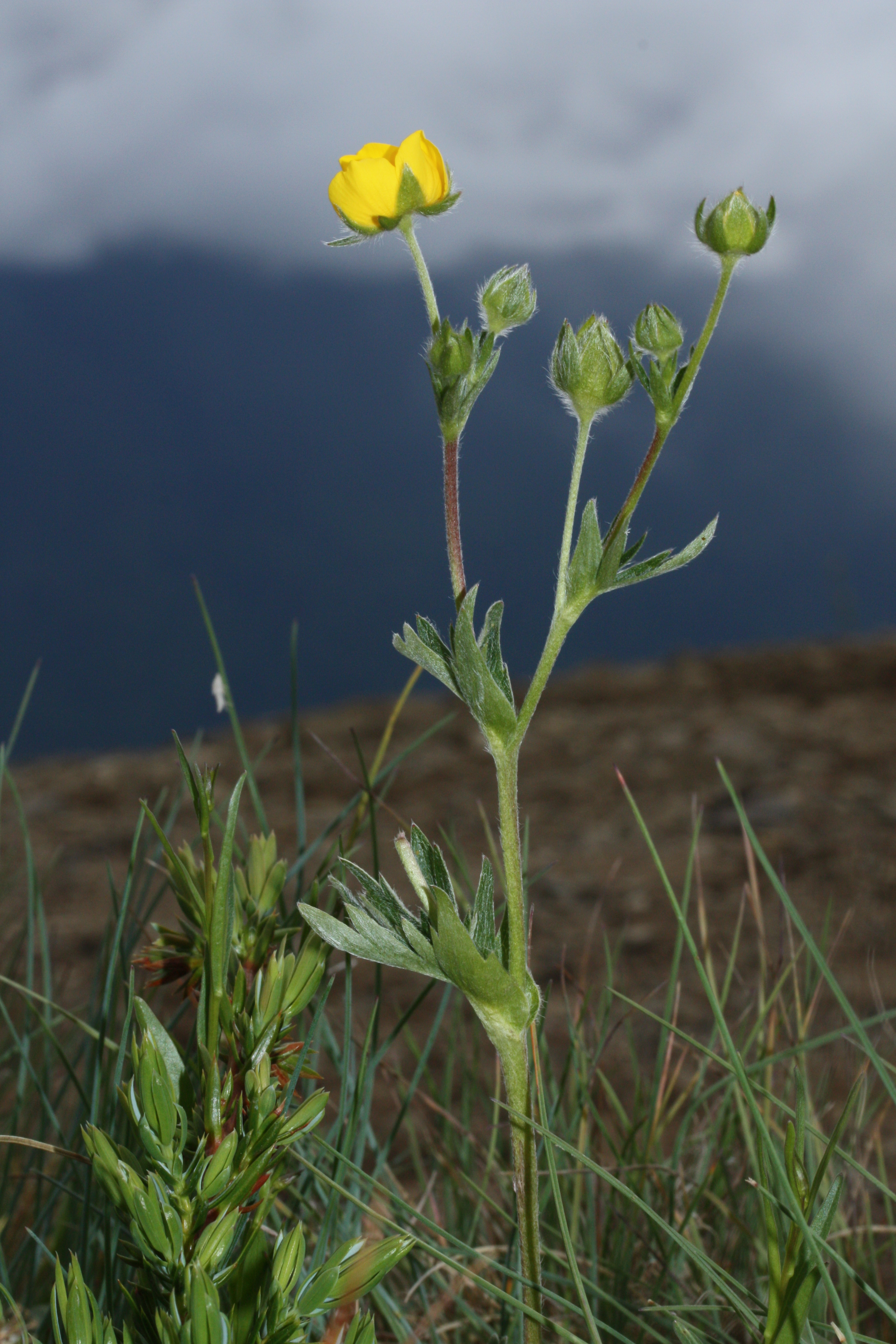

Scientific classification
- Kingdom: Plantae
- Clade: Embryophytes
- Clade: Tracheophytes
- Clade: Spermatophytes
- Clade: Angiosperms
- Clade: Eudicots
- Clade: Rosids
- Order: Rosales
- Family: Rosaceae
- Genus: Potentilla
- Species: P. diversifolia

Binomial name
- Potentilla diversifolia Lehm.

= Potentilla diversifolia =

Species of flowering plant

Potentilla diversifolia or Potentilla × diversifolia is a species of flowering plant in the Rose Family (Rosaceae) known by the common names varileaf cinquefoil, different-leaved cinquefoil, and mountain meadow cinquefoil.

== Distribution and habitat ==
It is native to North America, where it grows in moist habitat in many regions, in Alaska to Greenland, the Pacific Northwest and the Rocky Mountains, and from California to New Mexico.

=== Festuca association ===
This cinquefoil is a dominant plant in association with the grass Festuca idahoensis on the alpine slopes of mountainous western Montana and central Idaho.

== Description ==
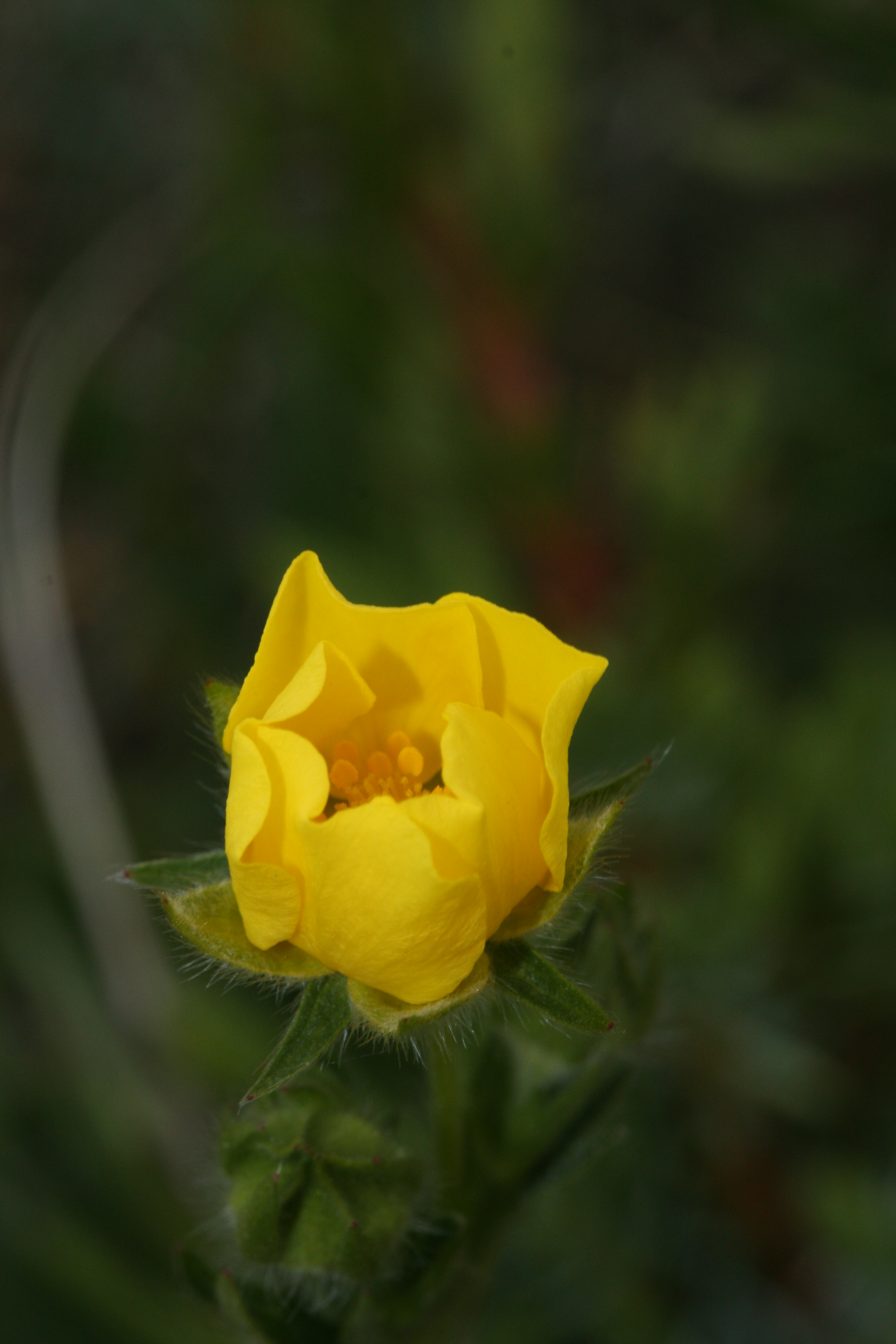
Flower of Potentilla diversifolia

Potentilla diversifolia has gray-green leaves divided into usually five leaflets, which are mostly hairless and are deeply lobed or have teeth along their distal margins. Most of the leaves are low on the stem, with smaller ones occurring above. The inflorescence is a cyme of several flowers. Each has a small corolla of yellow petals above a calyx of five pointed sepals and five narrower bractlets.

=== Varieties ===
There are three Potentilla diversifolia varieties:

- Potentilla diversifolia var. diversifolia occurs throughout western North America from Alaska, the Sierra Nevada in California, to the southern Rockies in New Mexico
- Potentilla diversifolia var. perdissecta occurs in and around the Rocky Mountains of Canada and the United States
- Potentilla diversifolia var. ranunculus can be found in Eastern Canada and Greenland.
