= Eqaluit =

- Location in Greenland
- Coordinates: 60°45′29″N 45°32′37″W
- Country: Denmark
- Autonomous Country: Greenland
- Municipality: Sermersooq
- District: Qaqortoq

Eqaluit is a commune in southern Greenland.

The commune has its own peninsula, which contains Julianehåb granite, a granite formed in the Precambrian era, named after the Julianehåb (now Qaqortoq) district.
