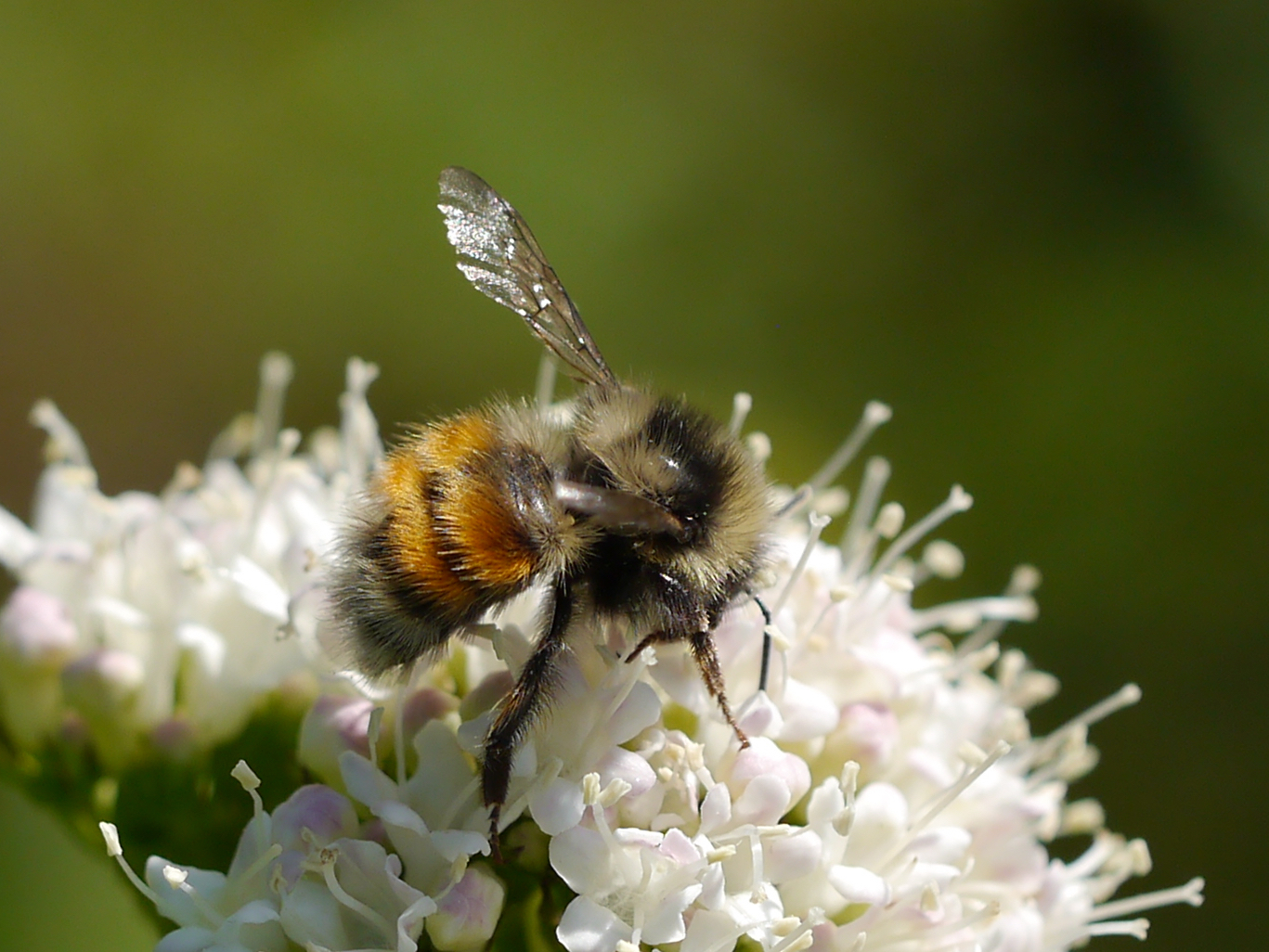

Conservation status
- Least Concern (IUCN 3.1)

Scientific classification
- Domain: Eukaryota
- Kingdom: Animalia
- Phylum: Arthropoda
- Class: Insecta
- Order: Hymenoptera
- Family: Apidae
- Genus: Bombus
- Subgenus: Pyrobombus
- Species: B. sylvicola

Binomial name
- Bombus sylvicola Kirby, 1837

= Bombus sylvicola =

Species of bee

Bombus sylvicola is a species of bumblebee native to North America. It occurs throughout most of Canada, its distribution extending into Alaska and the western contiguous United States. In the southernmost extent of its range in California it occurs only at elevation. It is known commonly as the forest bumblebee.

This is a common species. It is a bee of alpine and subarctic climates. It lives in open, grassy habitat such as mountain meadows. It nests underground, or sometimes on the surface. Its food plants include sandworts, rabbitbrush, fireweeds, lupines, coyote mints, butterburs, mountain heathers, and groundsels.

This was one of two bees featured in a study showing how climate change may be affecting their morphology. This species is polymorphic, with longer-tongued and shorter-tongued individuals. As the current climate change progresses, longer-tongued individuals are becoming less common in the population because flowers with long corollas are becoming less abundant. Shorter-tongued bees are having more success as generalist foragers among the available flora.

This species is very similar to the black-tailed bumblebee (B. melanopygus), the two sometimes having nearly identical color patterns.
