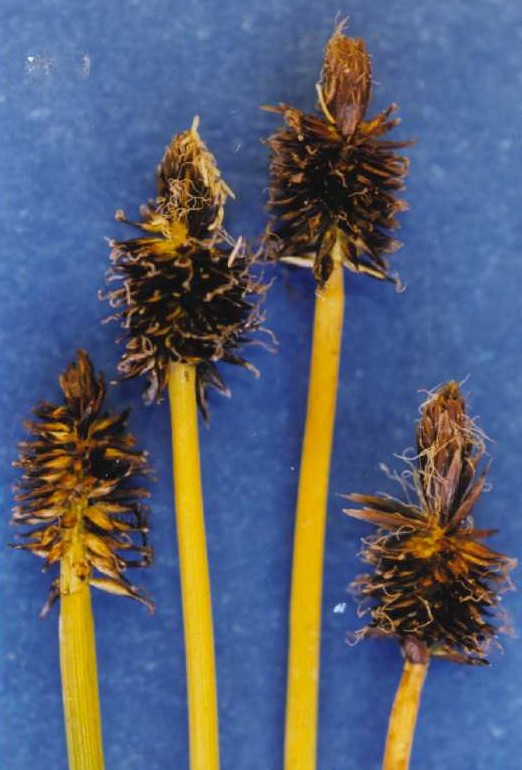

Scientific classification
- Kingdom: Plantae
- Clade: Tracheophytes
- Clade: Angiosperms
- Clade: Monocots
- Clade: Commelinids
- Order: Poales
- Family: Cyperaceae
- Genus: Carex
- Species: C. nigricans

Binomial name
- Carex nigricans C.A.Mey.

= Carex nigricans =

Species of plant

Carex nigricans is a species of sedge known by the common name black alpine sedge.

== Distribution ==
This sedge is native to western North America from Alaska to the Sierra Nevada in California, to Colorado, where it grows in wet areas in mountain, taiga, and tundra habitat.

== Description ==
Carex nigricans produces thick mats and loose clumps of stems up to 30 centimeters tall from a network of short rhizomes. The pistillate flowers have dark bracts and the fruit is covered in a dark colored, long beaked perigynium.
