= Bombus lantschouensis =

Scientific classification
- Kingdom: Animalia
- Phylum: Arthropoda
- Clade: Pancrustacea
- Class: Insecta
- Order: Hymenoptera
- Family: Apidae
- Genus: Bombus
- Species: B. lantschouensis

Binomial name
- Bombus lantschouensis (Vogt, 1908)

Bumblebee species

Bombus lantschouensis is one of many bumblebee species native to China. Like all bumblebee species, they are characterized by their round bodies that are larger than honeybees. They have diverse color patterns. but are known for their eye-catching black and yellow coloring. They are also known for their furry-like appearance due to their body being covered in soft hair which are long branched setae. This hair is referred to as pile.

While many bumblebee species in North America are well documented and accessible through various lists, few resources describe the species found in China. This may be because while China hosts an incredible species diversity of bumblebees, with over half of the world's species being located within the country, it also has the least well-known described bumblebee diversity. As of 2020, there are approximately 250 known species of bumblebee in the world, with about 125 species being documented in China.

== Distribution ==
Bombus lantschouensis is widely distributed within North China, particularly along the dry region of the southern edge of the Neimenggu plateau. It is especially abundant at medium elevations of the Helanshan mountains, the Liupanshan mountains, and the Luoshan mountains in Ningxia.

== Taxonomy ==
Like all bumblebee species, Bombus lantschouensis belongs to the genus Bombus, which is classified in the tribe Bombini of the subfamily Apinae of the family Apidae. This family is found within the third largest order within the class Insecta, known as Hymenoptera. This order encompasses bees, wasps, sawflies, and ants.

While in the early twentieth century, morphological characteristics were used to classify species within the genus Bombus, their highly variable color patterns and presence of convergent evolution in their morphology make it difficult to accurately identify them using only physical traits. However, the development of molecular techniques in species identification, specifically using molecular markers, has become an invaluable tool in the phylogenetic analysis and placement of bumblebee species.

== Behavior ==
=== Social behavior in colonies ===
Bombus lantschouensis are social insects with annual colony cycles, with their queens undergoing several physiological and developmental changes as they progress through their life cycle. These complex societies formed by these bumblebees are characteristic of eusocial insects, which is an extreme form of social behavior characterized by the presence of several generations in a colony simultaneously, and a defined division of labor with the queen reproducing and the workers seldom reproducing. Queen bumblebees will first undergo a solitary phase where they take care of the first-generation brood, after this phase there is a cooperative eusocial phase where this division of labor begins. Most bumblebee species only have one queen per colony and this queen is often monandrous, meaning she will only mate once.

=== Pollination and behavior ===
Much like other bee species, Bombus lantschouensis acts as an important pollinator for many flowering plants. It benefits by collecting nectar from plants to use as food, and the pollen itself provides protein, lipids, and other vitamins making it the most essential nutrient source for them. Pollen-foraging behavior of bees not only affects the reproductive success of their colony but also has a great impact on the fertilization success of the flowers they come into contact with.

Bumblebee pollination plays an important role in protected tomato cultivation in China, as they use a form of "buzz pollination" characterized by their ability to contract their flight muscles and vibrate tomato anthers to release pollen gains.

== Reproduction and life cycles ==
The life cycle of B. lantschouensis is much like other bumblebee species where they have an annual eusocial life cycle and the development of B. lantschouensis colonies is highly dependent on ovary activation in the queen. There is first a solitary phase where the queens will emerge from hibernation in spring where they then forage and find an appropriate nesting location to lay their eggs and begin the initiation of a new colony. Once these eggs emerge and the worker population grows, virgin queens and male drones are produced towards the end of the colony cycle in the late summer. In many species, these young bumblebee queens will mate with only one male and then hibernate before producing the next generation. This resting state during the winter that the queens enter is known as diapause, and they remain in this state until the weather warms again, the male drones that the queens mate with do not survive through winter, and the queens will store sperm from mating with these male drones in a storage chamber called the spermatheca.

== Agriculture uses ==
Bumblebees are some of the most efficient pollinators of wild plants and crops worldwide and since the 1980s they have been used commercially to pollinate greenhouse crops, as a result of this artificial bumblebee rearing has become immensely important to the agriculture industry. Bombus lantschouensis specifically is one of the most important pollinators in North China and has been selected for the pollination of many greenhouse crops in China due to its efficiency as a pollinator and its ability to increase pollen deposition significantly. Due to its excellent potential for artificial reproduction, this species has been selected to replace the imported European bumblebee B. terrestris which was previously used for commercial pollination in China. There have been recent findings that suggest that different native populations of bumblebees in China have different types of adaptations to coldness, which provides more insight into what bumblebees may be better suited for certain agricultural pollination in various regions of China.

== Threats ==
=== Current and future concerns ===
In recent years, many bumblebee species have been noted as being in a state of steady decline, with particular concerns being focused on Europe and North America. Even more concerning, several bumblebee species in central mainland China and northeastern Asia, including B. lantschouensis, have been predicted to become critically endangered or threatened due to their vulnerability to ongoing land use and climate change.

=== Conservation efforts ===
There are various extensive conservation efforts currently in effect for bumblebees worldwide. Some species remain quite common, while others are quite rare and have declined at a much quicker rate. It has been argued that conservation efforts should focus on delaying cutting grasslands until late September, thereby increasing foraging availability in the late season. As well as reducing pesticides and fertilizers while ensuring that suitable habitats are connected to facilitate the movement and dispersal of different species to new areas is key in supporting existing and future bumblebee populations.
