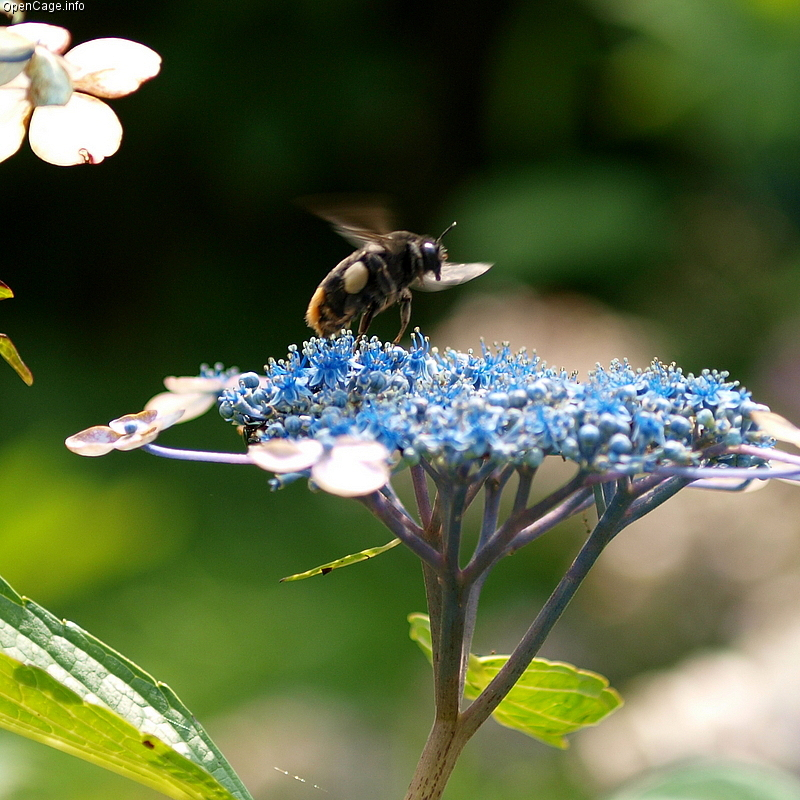

Scientific classification
- Kingdom: Animalia
- Phylum: Arthropoda
- Class: Insecta
- Order: Hymenoptera
- Family: Apidae
- Genus: Bombus
- Subgenus: Bombus
- Species: B. ignitus

Binomial name
- Bombus ignitus (Smith, 1869)

= Bombus ignitus =

Species of bee

Bombus ignitus is a species of bumblebee in the family Apidae. It is mainly distributed in Eastern Asia, commonly found in China, Japan and Korea. It is used in China and Japan commercially as a pollinator. B. ignitus is a eusocial insect with a queen that is monandrous: mating with only one male in the late summer before hibernating until the following spring. It builds its nest out of a mass of pollen and lays its eggs after completion. Due to numerous conflicts between queens and fertile workers, some surviving queens are badly injured, described by some as living corpses.

== Taxonomy ==
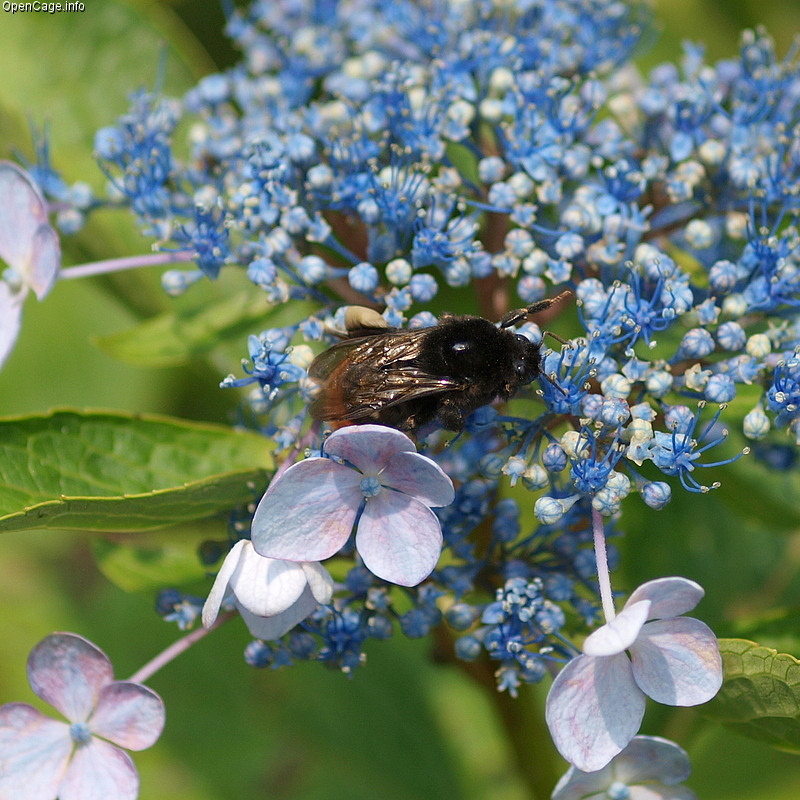
Bombus ignitus feeding on a blue hydrangea.

Bombus ignitus is part of the order Hymenoptera, which is the third largest order of insects. It is a member of the family Apidae, consisting of bees, and the subfamily Apinae, which contains the majority of species within Apidae. The subfamily Apinae consists of 14 tribes, including the tribe Bombini, which B. ignitus is a part of. Bombini contains a single living genus Bombus. B. ignitus can be further classified into the subgenus Bombus sensu stricto, or Bombus in the sense of the original author.

The species name ignitus is a Latin adjective, meaning "containing fire."

== Description ==
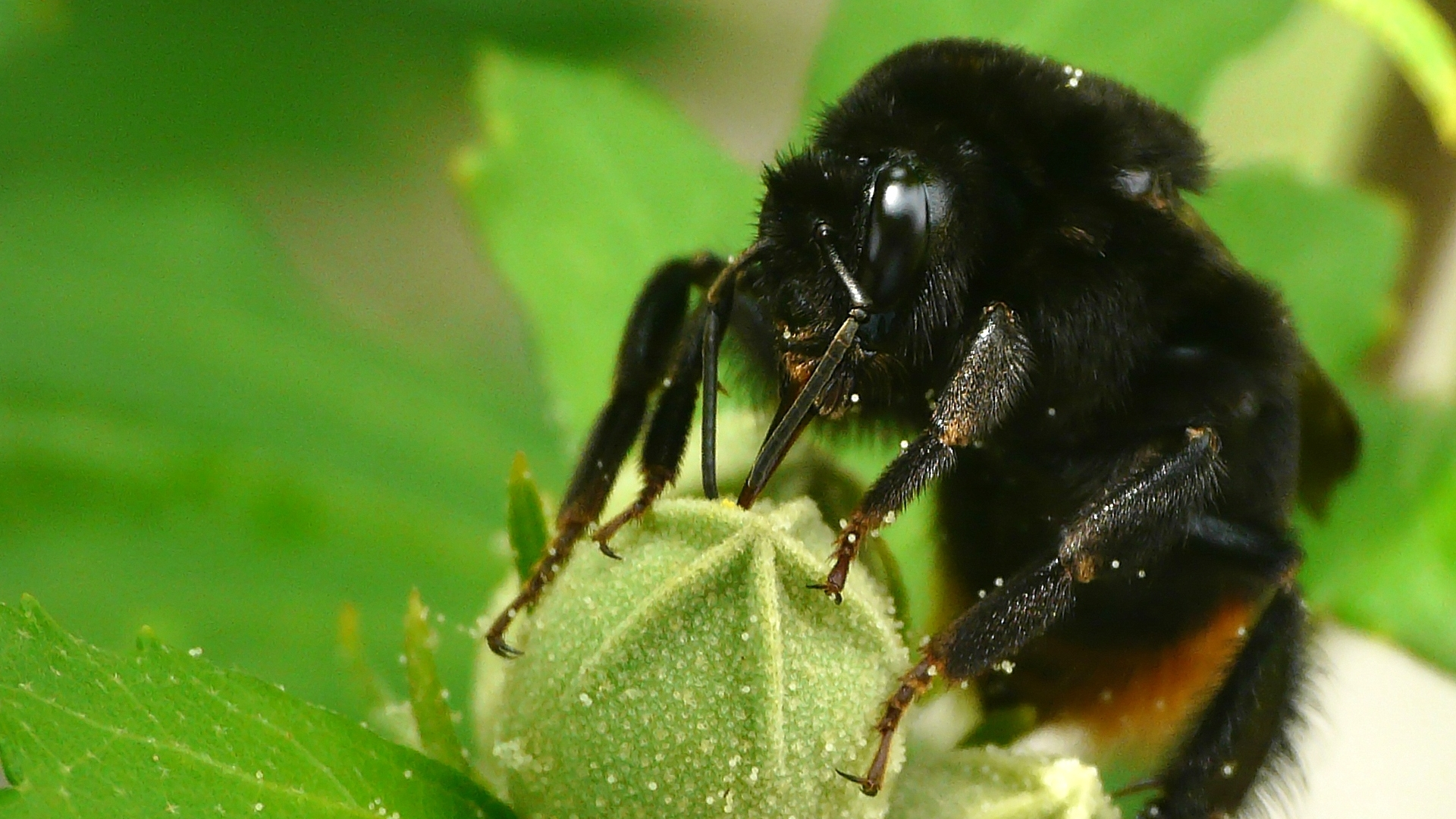
Bombus ignitus on Rose of Sharon bud.

Bombus ignitus is a large bee characterized by a medium length tongue. Females have black bristles that cover the back of the thorax and the mid-legs. The abdomen is separated into five tergum. Starting from the thorax, the first three terga are black in color, whereas the fourth and fifth terga are orange-red in color. Males are characterized by golden yellow bristles that form two bands on the anterior and posterior thorax. Like the female, the male has an abdomen separated into five tergum. Starting from the thorax, the first two terga are golden yellow in color, differentiating males from females. The third tergum is black in color. The fourth and fifth terga, like the female, is orange-red in color. Compared to the female, the male compound eye is small. The antenna of males are shorter than the antenna of females, reaching only to the base of the wings. Compared to the males of other bumblebee species, the males of B. ignitus have greatly broadened penis valves that flare outwards to form a funnel shape. The queen has a body length of 19 mm (0.75 in). Workers have a body length of 15–17 mm (0.59–0.67 in). Males have a body length of 17 mm (0.67 in).

== Distribution and habitat ==
Bombus ignitus is found in the Palearctic realm, primarily in East Asia. This includes the more humid and temperate areas China, Japan, and Korea. Populations of B. ignitus can be found at a mean altitude of 1425 m at the western, southern, and eastern foothills of the Sichuan Basin. Though uncommon, populations have been found at lower altitudes.

== Colony cycle ==
Colonies of B. ignitus are short-lived, with new colonies founded each year. Young queens mate with drones in the later summer, then hibernate and emerge in the following spring. Upon emerging from hibernation, these queens search for a suitable nesting site to start a colony. After a suitable site is found, these queen begin to gather pollen. A queen builds a mass of pollen at the nesting site, then lays her first batch of diploid eggs. Workers emerge from this first batch of eggs. These workers start to forage two to three days after emerging. With the emergence of workers, the queen is able to spend more time on oviposition. During the late summer, many new queens and new drones are produced. Only mated queens will hibernate through the fall and winter, then emerge in the spring.

== Behavior ==
=== Division of labor ===
Bombus ignitus exhibits a size dependent division of labor. An aforaging gene, Bifor, has been isolated in B. ignitus. Bifor expression negatively correlated with size, with higher levels of expression found in the smaller nurses. Foragers are larger in size and have lower levels of Bifor expression.

=== Mating behavior ===
Bombus ignitus is monandrous; the queen mates with only a single drone to form a colony. All workers and new queens, as a result, are descendants of the queen and a single drone. This monandrous behavior decreases the amount of genetic variation present in a single colony relative to that of a polygynous or polyandrous species.

=== Reproductive suppression ===
Both the queen and workers possess the ability to reproduce. The queen suppresses the reproductive actions of workers through increased aggressive action against reproductively active workers and destruction of eggs laid by workers. In colonies still dominated by the queen, the vast majority of drones are derived from the queen. In colonies where the queen has died, roughly half the drones are born from workers.

== Kin selection ==
=== Haplodiploidy ===
Bombus ignitus, like many bees, exhibit Haplodiploidy. Diploid queens produce diploid workers and new queens from fertilized eggs. Haploid drones are produced from unfertilized eggs, laid by either the queen or workers. All sperm produced by a drone is identical, containing its exact haploid DNA. Variation arises from females, who produce genetically variant eggs through meiosis. Sex is determined under a single-locus complementary sex determination (sl-CSD) system, where multiple alleles at a single locus determine the sex of an individual. Sex locus heterozygotes develop as females, while hemizygous and homozygous eggs develop as haploid and diploid males.

=== Genetic relatedness within colonies ===
As the queens of B. ignitus mate with only one male, the workers are more closely related to other workers (with whom they share an average of seventy five percent of their genes with) than to the queen (who they only share half their genes with). With respect to male offspring, workers are more closely related to the sons of other workers, sharing an average of 37.5 percent of their genes with them, than the sons of the queen, who they only share 25% of their genes with.

=== Worker queen conflict ===
Worker policing, manifested through aggressive actions against fertile workers and removal of the eggs of workers, has been observed in colonies of B. ignitus. Similarly, reproductive workers have been observed taking aggressive behavior against founding queens. These include eating the eggs laid by the queen and laying eggs themselves, as well as attacking the queen herself. In an analysis of seven B. ignitus colonies, the survival rate of colony founding queens was 72%. These queens had damaged wings or bodies, which suggests numerous conflicts with workers.

== Human importance ==
=== Agricultural ===
Bombus ignitus is currently used for agricultural pollination in China and Japan. The species has been chosen as a reliable species for commercial mass-production in Korea, though issues of diapause management must still be addressed. B. ignitus was chosen over the already established bumblebee, Bombus terrestris, for fear of competition or genetic contamination by mating with native bumblebee species.

=== Medical ===
The protein BiVSPI, Found in the venom of B. ignitus, has been identified as a serine protease inhibitor. BiVSPI exhibits antimicrobial functions, and has been found to inhibit the growth of Gram-positive bacteria and fungi. The cDNA of four antibacterial peptide genes - apidaecin, hymenoptaecin, abaecin, and defensin - were isolated and cloned from B. ignitus. Synthesized abaecin has been shown to inhibit the growth of Gram- negative bacteria, but had little inhibitory effect towards the growth of Gram-positive bacteria.
