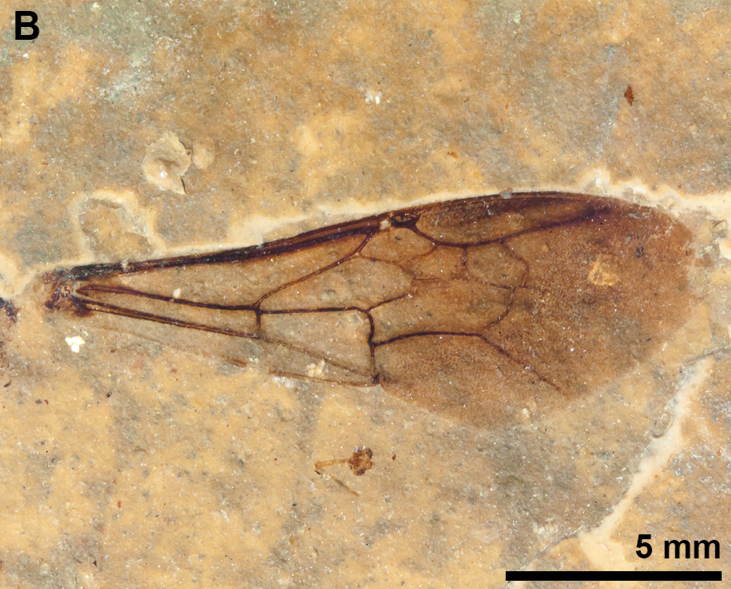
- B. randeckensis holotype wing

Scientific classification
- Domain: Eukaryota
- Kingdom: Animalia
- Phylum: Arthropoda
- Class: Insecta
- Order: Hymenoptera
- Family: Apidae
- Genus: Bombus
- Subgenus: Cullumanobombus
- Species: †B. randeckensis

Binomial name
- †Bombus randeckensis Wappler & Engel, 2012

= Bombus randeckensis =

Bombus randeckensis Temporal range: Mid - Late Miocene 18–16 Ma

Extinct species of bee

Bombus randeckensis is an extinct bumblebee from the Miocene rocks of the Randeck Maar in southwestern Germany. It was discovered in 2012, and initially placed in the subgenus Bombus, however, review of the Bombini fossil record by Dehon et al in 2019 concluded B. randeckensis should be placed in Bombus subgenus Cullumanobombus.
