= AIM-68 Big Q =

AIM-68
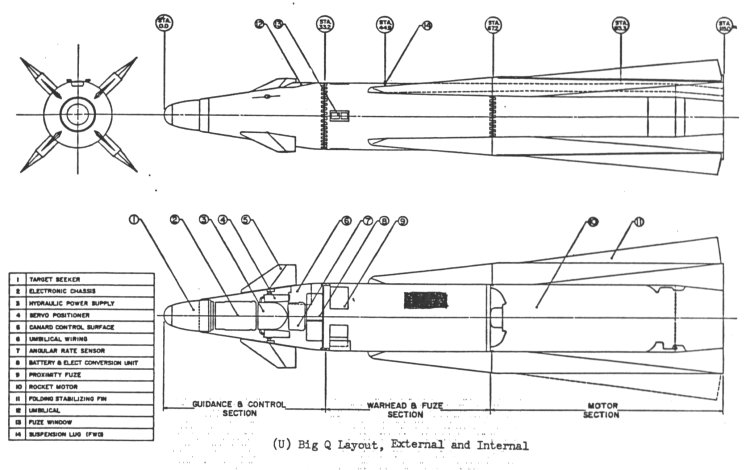
- Type: Air-to-air missile
- Place of origin: United States

Service history
- Used by: United States Air Force

Production history
- Designer: Air Force Weapons Laboratory
- Designed: 1965-1966
- No. built: 0

Specifications
- Mass: 500 lb (230 kg)
- Length: 9 ft 7 in (2.92 m)
- Diameter: 14 in (360 mm)
- Wingspan: 21 in (530 mm)
- Warhead: W30 nuclear
- Blast yield: 0.5 kT
- Propellant: Dual-thrust solid fuel
- Operational range: 40 mi (64 km)
- Maximum speed: Mach 4
- Guidance system: Dual-mode radar guidance/infrared homing
- Launch platform: F-101 Voodoo, F-106 Delta Dart

The AIM-68 was an American nuclear-armed air-to-air missile project of the 1960s. It never entered production.

== Overview ==
The Big Q began life in 1963 as a replacement for the AIR-2 Genie rocket. The Genie was unguided, and had generally poor flight performance characteristics. The Big Q was to be a much more capable weapon, intended to engage Soviet bombers.

Big Q is actually a nickname only. The right to name the missile was given to the initial designer, 1st Lt John McMasters, who chose the name of the Aztec serpent god Quetzalcoatl. This led to a tremendous number of pronunciation and spelling errors until virtually everybody associated with the project referred to it as Big Q for short.

In 1965 the ZAIM-68A designation was assigned to the missile. A 20% model was successfully tested in a wind tunnel during that year and in June a contract was awarded to National Tapered Wing Engineering Company to produce 20 fuselage sections for prototype missiles.

The AIM-68 was designed with a dual-thrust solid-propellant rocket and was capable of reaching speeds of Mach 4 over its 65-kilometre (40 mi) range. The prototypes were fitted with infrared guidance systems from GAR-2A/B (AIM-4C/D) Falcon missiles; the rocket motor from the AGM-12 Bullpup was used for propulsion. The warhead was a W30 0.5 kiloton nuclear warhead, smaller than the 1.5 kiloton model used on the Genie. The guidance system allowed the missile to be used against maneuvering targets, including single bombers, rather than whole formations as was the case for the Genie. The reduced yield and greater range also made using the weapon a far less hazardous prospect for the launching aircraft.

Potential users of the Big Q included the F-101B, F-102A, F-106A, F-4C. The size of the missile was dictated by these choices, as some of the aircraft carried weapons in an internal bay. As part of the effort to keep the size down, the missile was fitted with fold-out sections on the main wings.

There have been attempts to reuse the -68 designation; notably the U.S. Navy wanted their new Standard Block V missile to be known as the RIM-68A. This failed (the designation RIM-156A was used instead). In 1995, the Navy tried to change it again—apparently wanting an operational missile to have a continuous run with the RIM-66 Standard MR and RIM-67 Standard ER designations. The request was refused again.

== Specifications ==
- Length : 2.92 m (9 ft 7 in)
- Wingspan : 86 cm (2 ft 10 in) (with the wings extended)
- Diameter : 35 cm (1 ft 2 in)
- Weight : 225 kg (496 lb)
- Speed : Mach 4
- Range : 65 km (40 mi)
- Propulsion : Solid-fuel rocket
- Warhead : W30 Mod 4 Y2 nuclear (0.5 kt)
