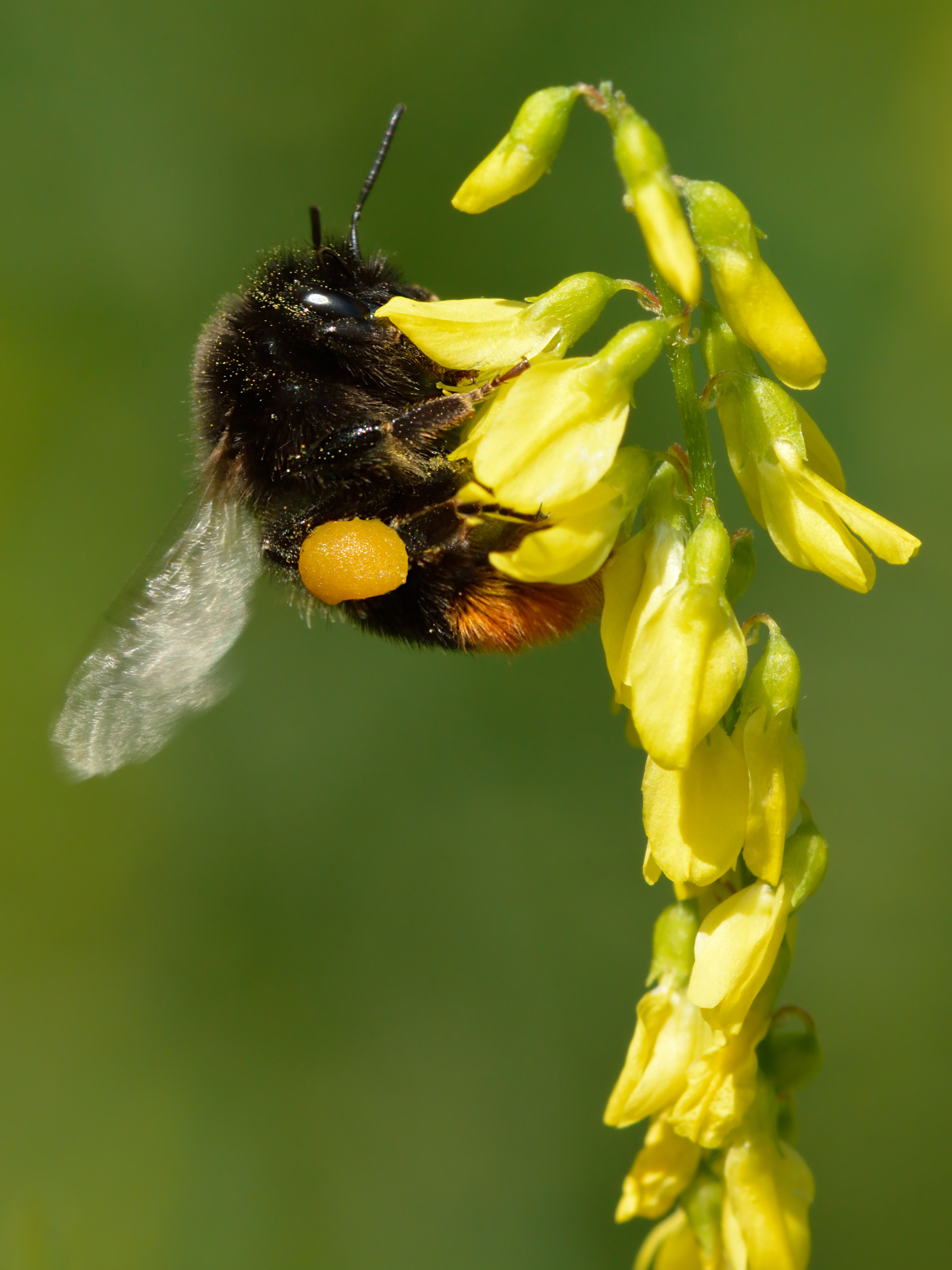
- Red-tailed bumblebee (Bombus lapidarius)

Scientific classification
- Kingdom: Animalia
- Phylum: Arthropoda
- Clade: Pancrustacea
- Class: Insecta
- Order: Hymenoptera
- Family: Apidae
- Tribe: Bombini
- Genus: Bombus; Latreille, 1802

Diversity
- > 250 species and subspecies
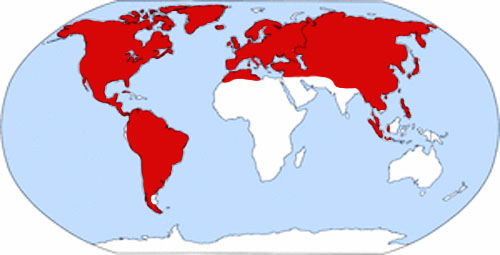
- Natural distribution shown in red.; Introductions to New Zealand, spread to Tasmania not shown

= Bumblebee =

Bumblebee Temporal range: Eocene–Present

Genus of insect

A bumblebee (or bumble bee, bumble-bee, or humble-bee) is any of over 250 species in the genus Bombus, part of Apidae, one of the bee families. This genus is the only extant group in the tribe Bombini, though a few extinct related genera (e.g., Calyptapis) are known from fossils. They are found primarily in the Northern Hemisphere, although they are also found in South America, where a few lowland tropical species have been identified. European bumblebees have also been introduced to New Zealand and Tasmania. Female bumblebees can sting repeatedly, but generally ignore humans and other animals.

Most bumblebees are eusocial insects that form colonies with a single queen. The colonies are smaller than those of honey bees, growing to as few as 50 individuals in a nest. Cuckoo bumblebees are brood parasitic and do not make nests or form colonies; their queens aggressively invade the nests of other bumblebee species, kill the resident queens and then lay their own eggs, which are cared for by the resident workers. Cuckoo bumblebees were previously classified as a separate genus, but are now usually treated as members of Bombus.

Bumblebees have round bodies covered in soft hair (long branched setae) called 'pile', making them appear and feel fuzzy. They have aposematic (warning) coloration, often consisting of contrasting bands of colour, and different species of bumblebee in a region often resemble each other in mutually protective Müllerian mimicry. Harmless insects such as hoverflies often derive protection from resembling bumblebees, in Batesian mimicry, and may be confused with them. Nest-making bumblebees can be distinguished from similarly large, fuzzy cuckoo bumblebees by the form of the female hind leg. In nesting bumblebees, it is modified to form a pollen basket, a bare shiny area surrounded by a fringe of hairs used to transport pollen, whereas in cuckoo bumblebees, the hind leg is hairy all around, and they never carry pollen.

Like their honey bee relatives, bumblebees feed on nectar, using their long hairy tongues to lap up the liquid; the proboscis is folded under the head during flight. Bumblebees gather nectar to add to the stores in the nest, and pollen to feed their young. They forage using colour and spatial relationships to identify flowers to feed from. Some bumblebees steal nectar, making a hole near the base of a flower to access the nectar while avoiding pollen transfer. Bumblebees are important agricultural pollinators, so their decline in Europe, North America, and Asia is a cause for concern. The decline has been caused by habitat loss, the mechanisation of agriculture, and pesticides.

== Etymology ==
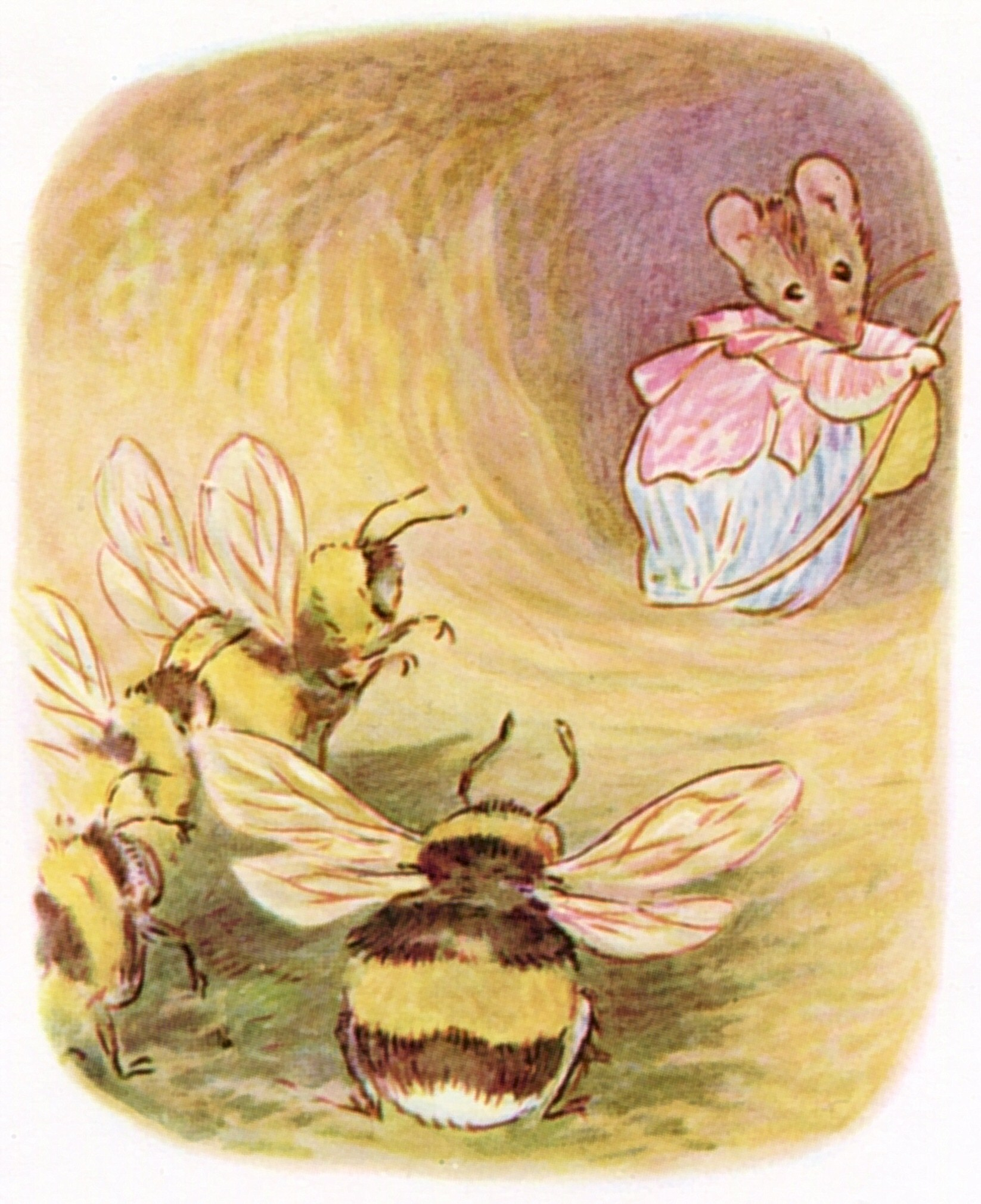
Beatrix Potter's 1910 story The Tale of Mrs. Tittlemouse features a "bumble bee" called Babbity Bumble.

The English name bumblebee combines bumble, meaning to buzz or hum, imitative of the insect's sound, with bee. The generic name Bombus, introduced by Pierre André Latreille in 1802, derives from the Latin bombus ('buzzing' or 'booming'), itself from Ancient Greek βόμβος (bómbos).

Charles Darwin referred to bumblebees as "humble-bees" in his 1859 book On the Origin of Species, emphasising their importance in pollinating clovers and other wildflowers. The term humblebee remained in use through the 19th century, but was gradually replaced by bumblebee in both scientific and common language during the 20th century.

== Evolution ==
=== Phylogeny ===
The tribe Bombini (bumblebees) is one of four lineages of corbiculate bees in the Apidae. It is distinguished by having pollen baskets (corbiculae) on their hind legs. The other three are the Apini (honeybees), Euglossini (orchid bees), and Meliponini (stingless bees). Together they form a monophyletic group.

Early analyses of morphology and behaviour suggested that complex eusociality evolved twice within the corbiculate bees, once in the ancestor of the Apini and once in the Meliponini. Molecular and morphological data indicate that the primitively eusocial Bombini are, despite appearances, closely related to the Meliponini, while the Apini and Euglossini form a separate branch. Cardinal and Danforth (2011) described this dual-origin model as consistent with earlier evidence from social and anatomical traits.

- Corbiculata
  - - eusocial
      Apini (honeybees)
    - Euglossini (orchid bees)
  - - Bombini (bumblebees)
    - eusocial
      Meliponini (stingless bees)

More recent phylogenomic studies based on the mRNA expression profile from more than 3,600 genes support instead a single origin of eusociality within the corbiculate bees. Romiguier et al. (2015) found that the Bombini, Meliponini, and Apini form a single clade, with Euglossini as their sister group, implying that advanced social organisation arose once in the common ancestor of these three tribes.

Revisiting the "corbiculate controversy", on the mismatch between morphological and molecular analyses in 2021, Diego Sasso Porto and Eduardo A. B. Almeida find that morphological analysis still suggests that Bombini are sister to a clade containing Apini and Meliponini, as shown in the phylogenetic tree. They propose "a more conciliatory" scenario involving "a diversification followed by several extinctions" so that Meliponini and Bombini shared "few apomorphic changes", while the similarities between Meliponini and Apini could be convergent evolution caused by "similar biology or similar eusocial behaviors".

- Corbiculata
  - Euglossini (orchid bees)
  - - Bombini (bumblebees)
    - eusocial
      - Apini (honeybees)
      - Meliponini (stingless bees)

The earliest divergence estimates suggest that the Bombini originated between 25 and 40 million years ago, whereas the Bombini–Meliponini clade dates to roughly 80–95 million years ago, around the time the corbiculate group as a whole diversified.

=== Fossil record ===
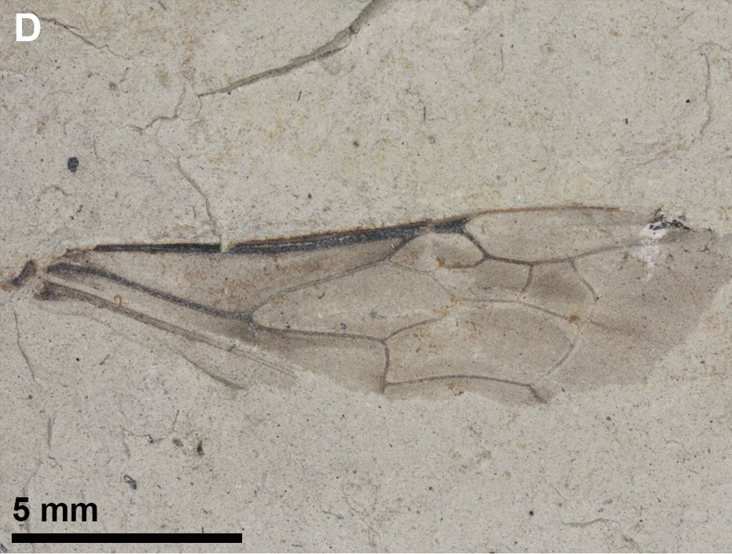
Bombus pristinus described in 1867

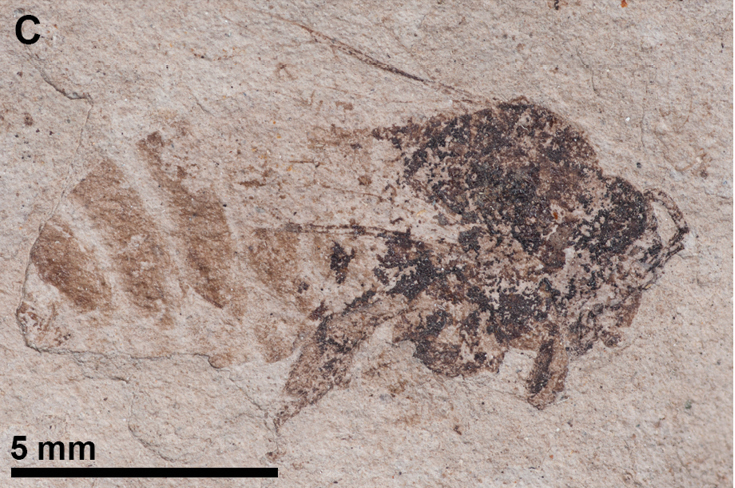
Calyptapis florissantensis, Eocene Florissant Formation

Fossil evidence of Bombini is limited. By 2019, about 14 potential fossil species had been described. The oldest known relatives include Calyptapis florissantensis from the Late Eocene Florissant Formation (United States) and Oligobombus cuspidatus from the Bembridge Marls (Isle of Wight).

Several Oligocene and Miocene species have been assigned to modern subgenera, including Bombus (Mendacibombus) beskonakensis and B. (Paraelectrobombus) patriciae from Turkey, B. randeckensis from Germany, B. cerdanyensis from Spain, and B. trophonius from the Czech Republic.

These fossils indicate that the major subgenera of Bombus were already differentiated by the Miocene and that diversification of the tribe was well underway by the Oligocene.

== Taxonomy ==
The genus Bombus, the only one extant genus in the tribe Bombini, comprises over 250 species; for an overview of the differences between bumblebees and other bees and wasps, see characteristics of common wasps and bees. The genus has been divided variously into up to 49 subgenera, a degree of complexity criticised by Williams (2008). The cuckoo bumblebees Psithyrus have sometimes been treated as a separate genus but are now considered to be part of Bombus.

- Bombus (genus)
  - - Mendacibombus, 12 species
    - Bombias, 3 species
    - - Kallobombus, 1 species
      - long‑faced
        - Orientalibombus, 3 species
        - Subterraneobombus, 10 species
        - - Megabombus, 22 species
          - - Thoracobombus, 50 species
            - social parasites
              Psithyrus, 30 species
      - short‑faced
        - - Pyrobombus, 50 species
          - - Alpinobombus, 5 species
            - Bombus, 5 species
        - - Alpigenobombus, 7 species
          - Melanobombus, 17 species
          - - Sibiricobombus, 7 species
            - Cullumanobombus, 23 species

Subgenera of the genus Bombus

== Description ==
Bumblebees vary in appearance, but are characteristically plump and densely furry. They are larger, broader and stouter-bodied than honeybees, and the tip of the abdomen is more rounded. Many species have broad bands of colour, whose patterns help to distinguish different species. Whereas honeybees have short tongues and therefore mainly pollinate open flowers, some bumblebee species have long tongues and collect nectar from flowers that are closed into a tube. Bumblebees have fewer stripes (or none), and usually have part of the body covered in black fur, while honeybees have many stripes including several grey stripes on the abdomen. Sizes are very variable even within species; the largest British species, B. terrestris, has queens up to 22 mm (0.9 in) long, males up to 16 mm (0.6 in) long, and workers between 11 and 17 mm (0.4–0.7 in) long. The largest bumblebee species in the world is B. dahlbomii of Chile, up to about 40 mm (1.6 in) long, and described as "flying mice" and "a monstrous fluffy ginger beast".

== Distribution and habitat ==
=== Abundance and diversity ===
Bumblebees are most abundant across temperate and montane ecosystems of the Northern Hemisphere, with the greatest species richness found in Eurasia and North America. Bumblebees have a largely cosmopolitan distribution but are absent from Australia (apart from Tasmania, where they have been introduced) and occur in Africa only north of the Sahara. More than a hundred years ago they were also introduced to New Zealand, where they play an important role as efficient pollinators.

At the northern limits of their range, species such as Bombus polaris, B. alpinus, and the parasitic B. hyperboreus occupy Arctic tundra ecosystems that extend as far north as Greenland and Canada's Ellesmere Island. These populations endure some of the planet's shortest flowering seasons and coldest conditions, marking the northernmost boundary of eusocial insect life.

=== Physiological adaptations ===
One reason for bumblebee presence in such cold places is that they can regulate their body temperature through several physiological mechanisms. They use solar radiation to warm themselves, generate heat internally through "shivering" known as heterothermy, and employ countercurrent exchange to retain heat. Although other bees show similar forms of thermoregulation, these mechanisms are especially well developed and extensively studied in bumblebees. They also adapt to high-elevation environments by increasing their wing stroke amplitude to sustain flight in thin air.

== Biology ==
=== Feeding ===
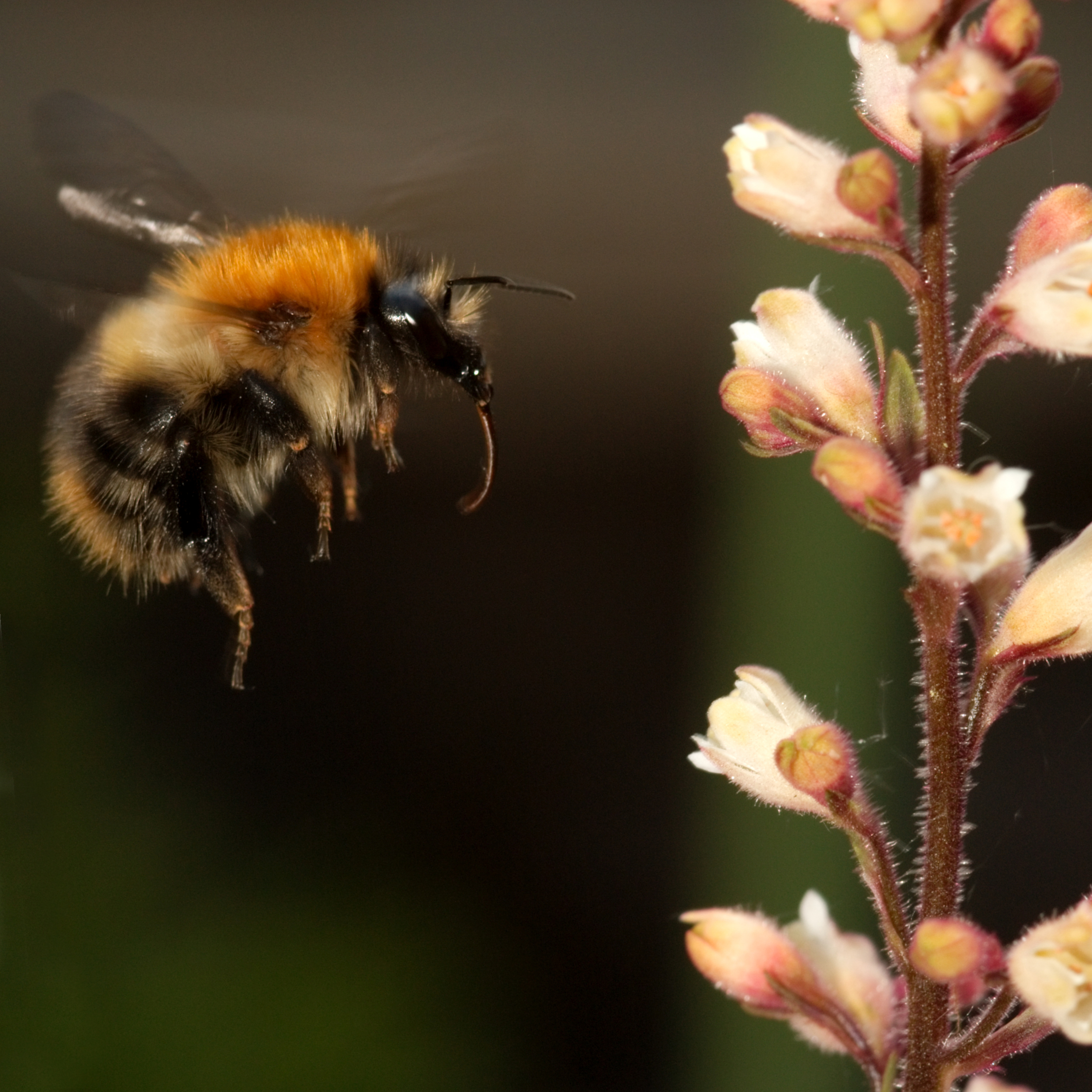
A common carder bumblebee Bombus pascuorum extending its tongue towards a Heuchera inflorescence

Slow motion video of a bumblebee using its proboscis to suck up nectar

The bumblebee tongue (the proboscis) is a long, hairy structure that extends from a sheath-like modified maxilla. The primary action of the tongue is lapping or repeated dipping of the tongue into liquid. The tip of the tongue probably acts as a suction cup and during lapping, nectar may be drawn up the proboscis by capillary action. When at rest or flying, the proboscis is kept folded under the head. The longer the tongue, the deeper the bumblebee can probe into a flower and bees probably learn from experience which flower source is best-suited to their tongue length. Bees with shorter proboscides, like Bombus bifarius, have a more difficult time foraging nectar relative to other bumblebees with longer proboscides; to overcome this disadvantage, B. bifarius workers were observed to lick the back of spurs on the nectar duct, which resulted in a small reward.

=== Wax production ===
The exoskeleton of the abdomen is divided into plates called dorsal tergites and ventral sternites. Wax is secreted from glands on the abdomen and extruded between the sternites where it resembles flakes of dandruff. It is secreted by the queen when she starts a nest and by young workers. It is scraped from the abdomen by the legs, moulded until malleable and used in the construction of honeypots, to cover the eggs, to line empty cocoons for use as storage containers and sometimes to cover the exterior of the nest.

=== Coloration ===
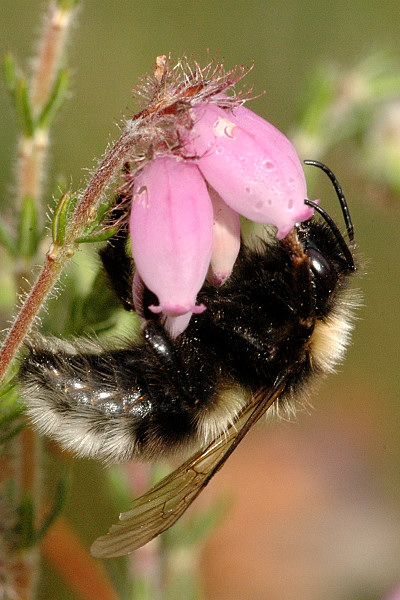
Cuckoo bumblebees, like this Bombus barbutellus, have similar aposematic (warning) coloration to nest-making bumblebees, and may also mimic their host species.

The black-and-yellow coloration of bumblebees acts as an aposematic (warning) signal to predators, indicating that the insects can inflict a painful sting. This visual warning serves as an anti-predator adaptation that discourages birds and other vertebrates, representing a common example of aposematism among members of the Hymenoptera. Depending on the species and morph, the warning colours range from entirely black, to bright yellow, red, orange, white, and pink. Dipteran flies in the families Syrphidae (hoverflies), Asilidae (robber flies), Tabanidae (horseflies), Oestridae (bot or warble flies) and Bombyliidae (bee flies, such as Bombylius major) all include Batesian mimics of bumblebees, resembling them closely enough to deceive at least some predators.

Many species of Bombus, including the Psithyrus group of cuckoo bumblebees, have evolved a form of Müllerian mimicry. This is a system in which different bumblebee species within the same region share similar warning color patterns, so that a predator only has to learn once to avoid any of them. In California, for example, several largely black species like B. californicus, B. caliginosus, B. vandykei, B. vosnesenskii, B. insularis, and B. fernaldae, form one such mimicry group. Another group in the same region includes species banded in black and yellow. In both cases, the shared coloration gives all members of the group a selective advantage.

Parasitic, or cuckoo, bumblebees also tend to resemble their hosts more closely than would be expected by chance, especially in regions such as Europe where parasite and host species have evolved together. This resemblance is likely another case of Müllerian mimicry, rather than a strategy to deceive the host through aggressive mimicry.

=== Temperature control ===
Bumblebees can be active in cooler and less favorable weather than most other flying insects. Here it is cool and raining. (with audio)

Bumblebees are active under conditions during which honeybees and other smaller bees stay at home, and can readily absorb heat from even weak sunshine. The thick pile created by long setae (bristles) acts as insulation to keep bumblebees warm in cold weather; species from cold climates have longer setae (and thus thicker insulation) than those from the tropics. The temperature of the flight muscles, which occupy much of the thorax, needs to be at least 30 °C (86 °F) before flight can take place. The muscle temperature can be raised by shivering. It takes about five minutes for the muscles to reach this temperature at an air temperature of 13 °C (55 °F).

==== Chill-coma temperature ====
The chill-coma temperature in relation to flying insects is the temperature at which flight muscles cannot be activated. Compared to honey bees and carpenter bees, bumblebees have the lowest chill-coma temperature. Of the bumblebees Bombus bimaculatus has the lowest at 7 °C (45 °F). However, bumblebees have been seen to fly in colder ambient temperatures. This discrepancy is likely because the chill-coma temperature was determined by tests done in a laboratory setting. However, bumblebees live in insulated shelters and can shiver to warm up before venturing into the cold.

=== Communication and social learning ===
Bumblebees do not have ears, and it is not known whether or how well they can hear. However, they are sensitive to vibrations transmitted through substrates such as wood or other materials.

Unlike the well-known "dance" communication of honeybees, bumblebees do not perform a spatial waggle or round dance to indicate the location of food sources. Instead, when a forager returns from a successful trip to the nest, it often moves rapidly and excitedly around the nest for several minutes before departing again to forage.

Bumblebees have also been observed to engage in social learning. In experiments with Bombus terrestris, workers were trained to solve a novel task (string-pulling) to obtain a reward, and naïve individuals that observed trained demonstrators were significantly more successful than those that did not. Furthermore, subsequent work showed that novel problem-solving behaviours can spread through bumblebee colonies via social learning under open-diffusion conditions.

=== Reproduction and nesting ===
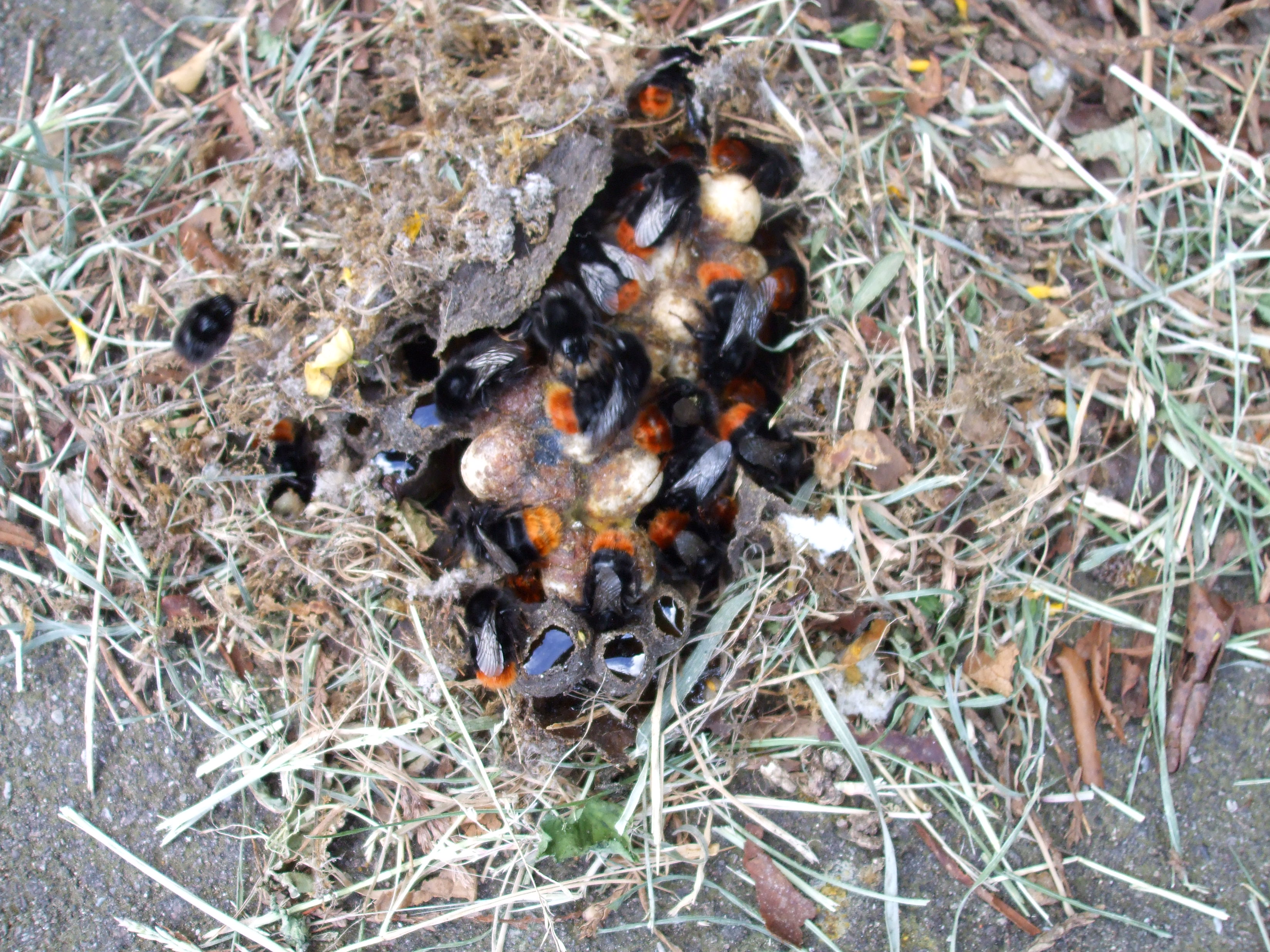
Nest of red-tailed bumblebee. Bombus lapidarius, showing wax pots full of honey

Nest size depends on species of bumblebee. Most form colonies of between 50 and 400 individuals, but colonies have been documented as small as ~20 individuals and as large as 1700. These nests are small compared to honeybee hives, which hold about 50,000 bees. Many species nest underground, choosing old rodent burrows or sheltered places, and avoiding places that receive direct sunlight that could result in overheating. Other species make nests above ground, whether in thick grass or in holes in trees. A bumblebee nest is not organised into hexagonal combs like that of a honeybee; the cells are instead clustered together untidily. The workers remove dead bees or larvae from the nest and deposit them outside the nest entrance, helping to prevent disease. Nests in temperate regions last only for a single season and do not survive the winter.

In the early spring, the queen comes out of diapause and finds a suitable place to create her colony. Then she builds wax cells in which to lay her eggs which were fertilised the previous year. The eggs that hatch develop into female workers, and in time, the queen populates the colony, with workers feeding the young and performing other duties similar to honeybee workers. In temperate zones, young queens (gynes) leave the nest in the autumn and mate, often more than once, with males (drones) that are forcibly driven out of the colony. The drones and workers die as the weather turns colder; the young queens feed intensively to build up stores of fat for the winter. They survive in a resting state (diapause), generally below ground, until the weather warms up in the spring with the early bumblebee being the species that is among the first to emerge. Many species of bumblebee follow this general trend within the year. Bombus pensylvanicus is a species that follows this type of colony cycle. For this species the cycle begins in February, reproduction starts in July or August, and ends in the winter months. The queen remains in hibernation until spring of the following year in order to optimize conditions to search for a nest.

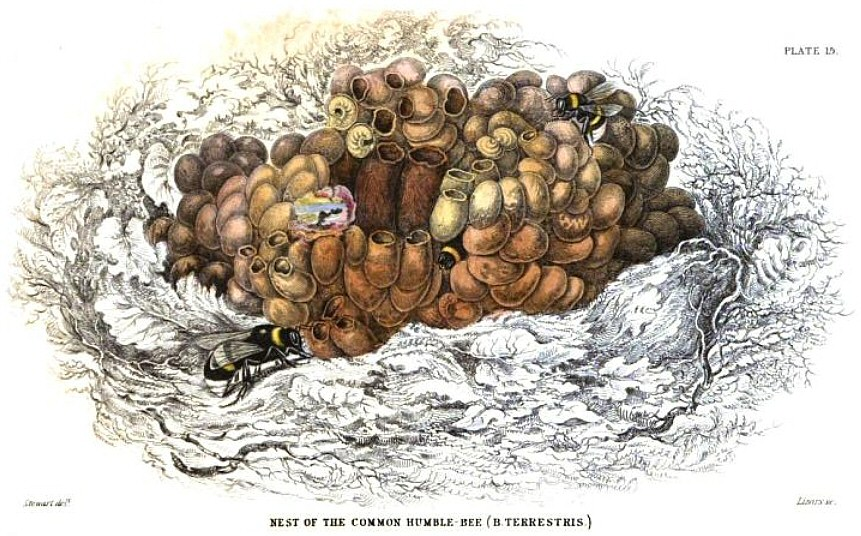
Bumblebee life-cycle showing adults and larvae in nest of B. terrestris. Engraved in 1840 by William Home Lizars after drawing probably by James Hope Stewart.

In fertilised queens, the ovaries only become active when the queen starts to lay. An egg passes along the oviduct to the vagina where there is a chamber called the spermatheca, in which the sperm from the mating is stored. Depending on need, she may allow her egg to be fertilised. Unfertilised eggs become haploid males; fertilised eggs grow into diploid females and queens. The hormones that stimulate the development of the ovaries are suppressed in female worker bees, while the queen remains dominant.

To develop, the larvae must be fed both nectar for carbohydrates and pollen for protein. Bumblebees feed nectar to the larvae by chewing a small hole in the brood cell into which they regurgitate nectar. Larvae are fed pollen in one of two ways, depending on the bumblebee species. Pocket-making bumblebees create pockets of pollen at the base of the brood-cell clump from which the larvae feed themselves. Pollen-storing bumblebees keep pollen in separate wax pots and feed it to the larvae.

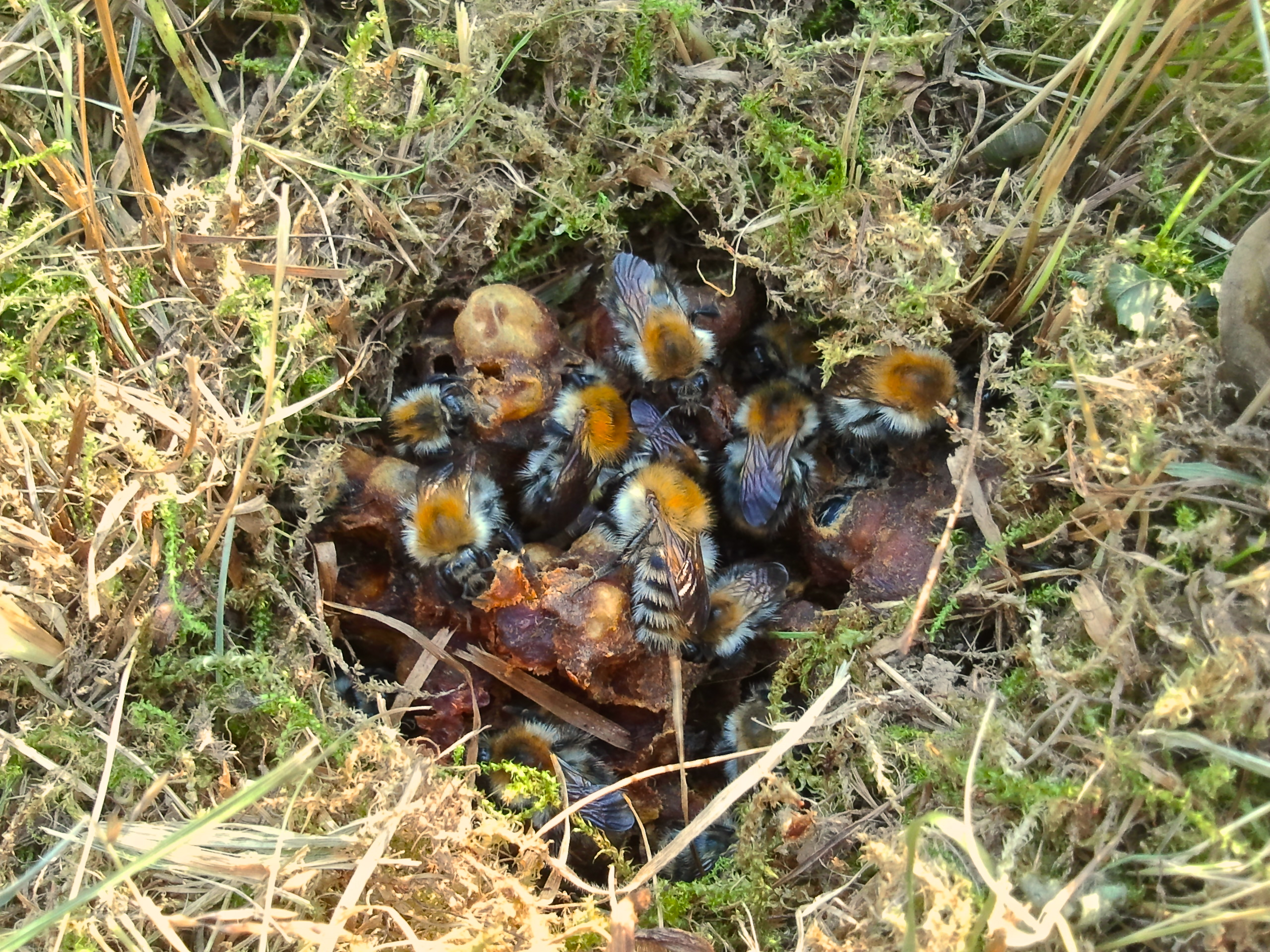
An above-ground nest, hidden in grass and moss, of the common carder bee, Bombus pascuorum. The wax canopy or involucrum has been removed to show winged workers and pupae in irregularly placed wax cells.

After the emergence of the first or second group of offspring, workers take over the task of foraging and the queen spends most of her time laying eggs and caring for larvae. The colony grows progressively larger and eventually begins to produce males and new queens. Bumblebee workers can lay unfertilised haploid eggs (with only a single set of chromosomes) that develop into viable male bumblebees. Only fertilised queens can lay diploid eggs (one set of chromosomes from a drone, one from the queen) that mature into workers and new queens.

In a young colony, the queen minimises reproductive competition from workers by suppressing their egg-laying through physical aggression and pheromones. Worker policing leads to nearly all eggs laid by workers being eaten. Thus, the queen is usually the mother of all of the first males laid. Workers eventually begin to lay male eggs later in the season when the queen's ability to suppress their reproduction diminishes. Because of the reproductive competition between workers and the queen, bumblebees are considered "primitively eusocial".

Although a large majority of bumblebees follow such monogynous colony cycles that only involve one queen, some select Bombus species (such as Bombus pauloensis) will spend part of their life cycle in a polygynous phase (have multiple queens in one nest during these periods of polygyny).

=== Foraging behaviour ===
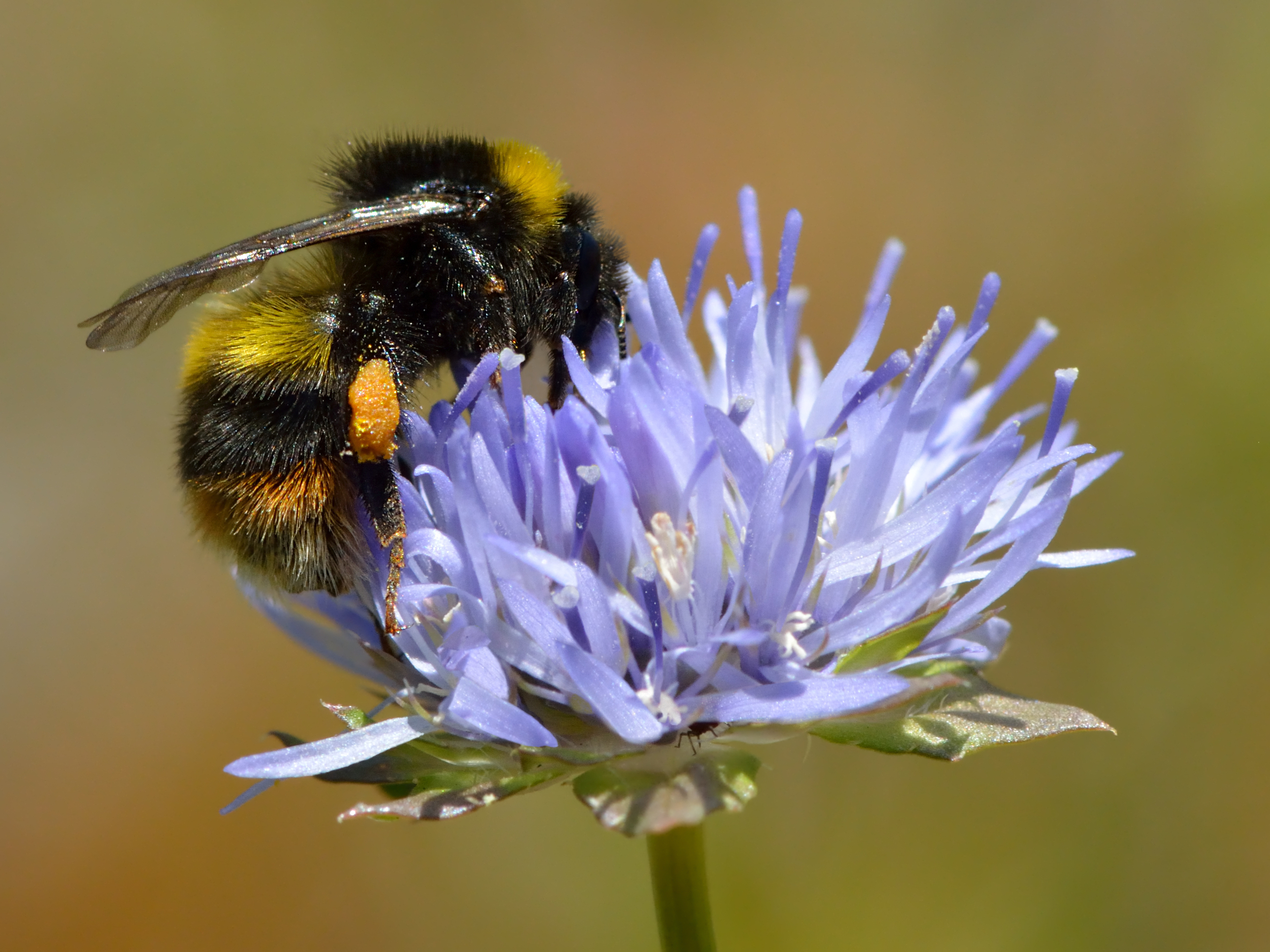
A bumblebee loaded with pollen in its pollen baskets

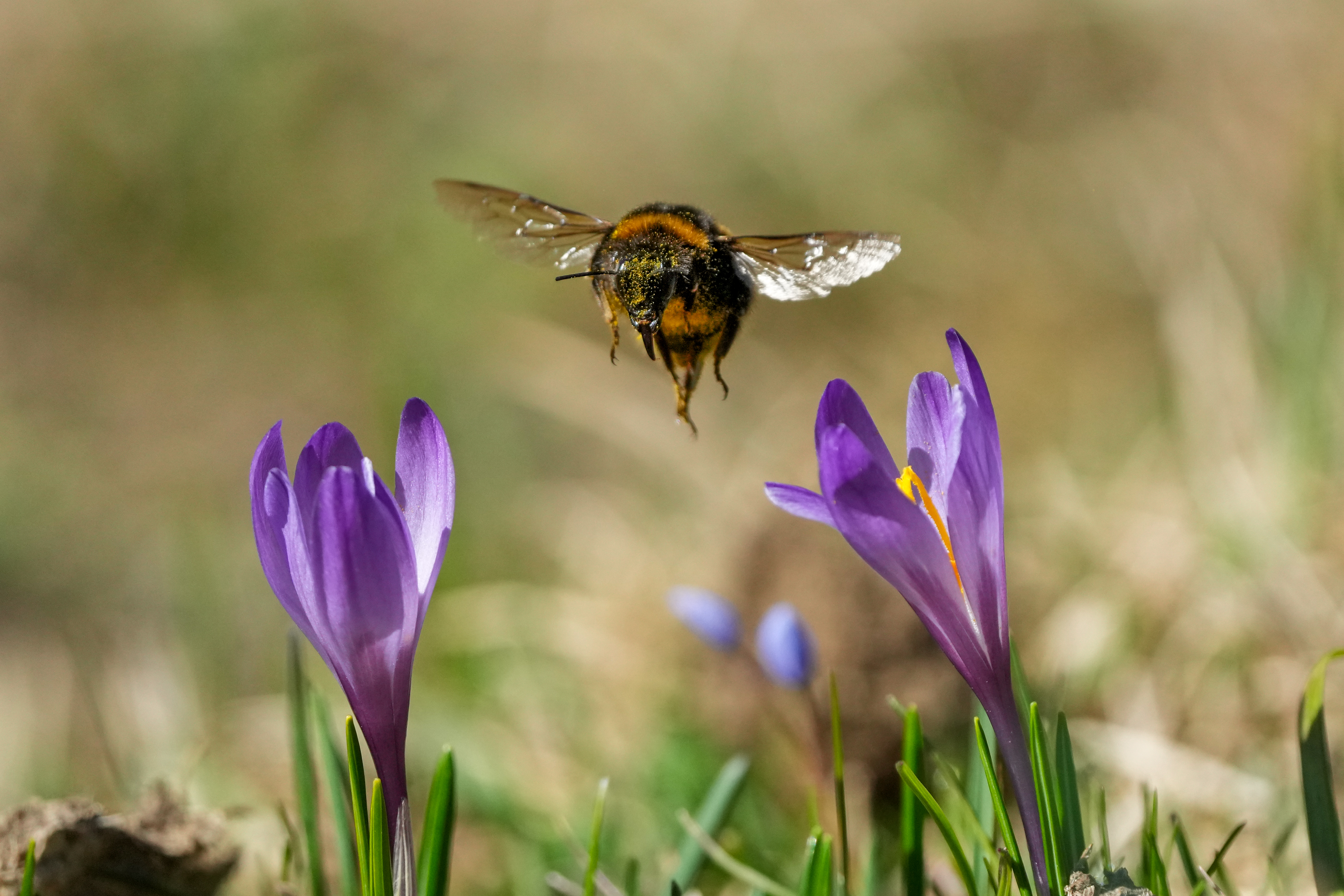
A bumblebee loaded with pollen flying to a Crocus

Yellow-faced bumblebee foraging California lilac. Repeated a second time at one-fourth speed.

Bumblebees generally visit flowers that exhibit the bee pollination syndrome and these patches of flowers may be up to 1–2 km from their colony. They tend to visit the same patches of flowers every day, as long as they continue to find nectar and pollen there, a habit known as pollinator or flower constancy. While foraging, bumblebees can reach ground speeds of up to 15 m/s (54 km/h).

Bumblebees use a combination of colour and spatial relationships to learn which flowers to forage from. They can also detect both the presence and the pattern of electric fields on flowers, which occur due to atmospheric electricity, and take a while to leak away into the ground. They use this information to find out if a flower has been recently visited by another bee. Bumblebees can detect the temperature of flowers, as well as which parts of the flower are hotter or cooler and use this information to recognise flowers. After arriving at a flower, they extract nectar using their long tongues ("glossae") and store it in their crops. Many species of bumblebees also exhibit "nectar robbing": instead of inserting the mouthparts into the flower in the normal way, these bees bite directly through the base of the corolla to extract nectar, avoiding pollen transfer.

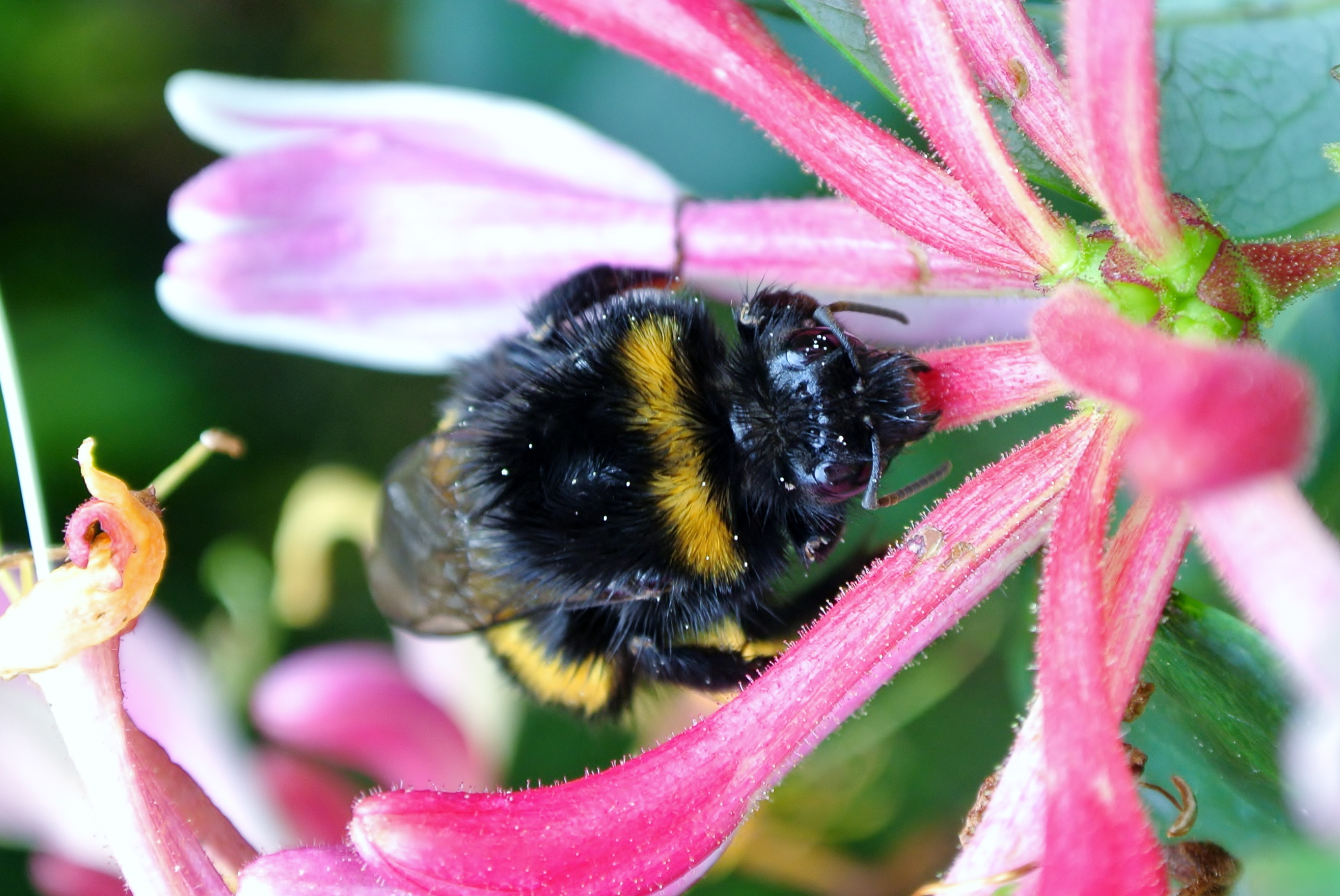
Biting open the stem of a flower...

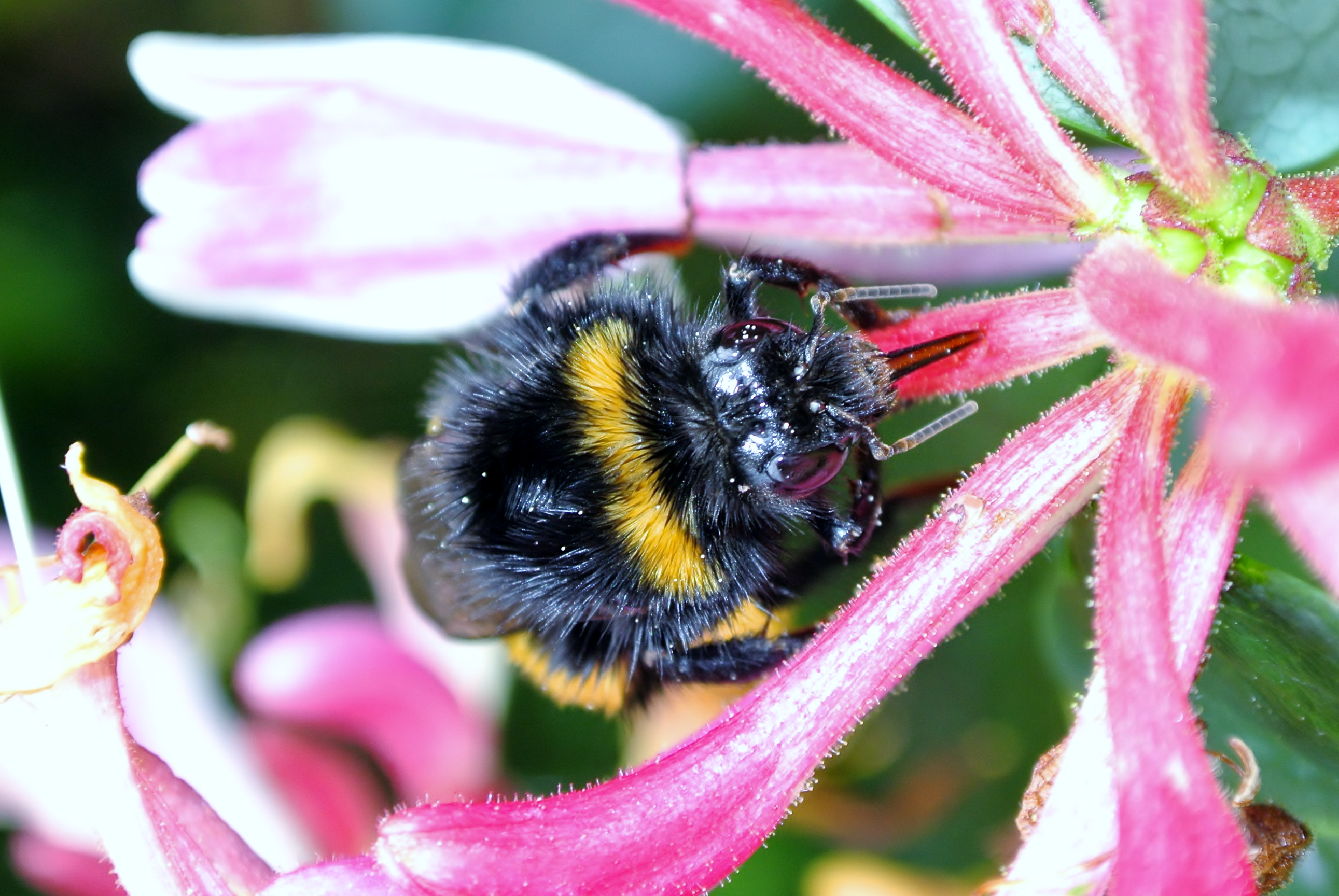
...and using its tongue to drink the nectar.

A bumblebee "nectar robbing" a flower

Pollen is removed from flowers deliberately or incidentally by bumblebees. Incidental removal occurs when bumblebees come in contact with the anthers of a flower while collecting nectar. When it enters a flower, the bumblebee's body hairs receive a dusting of pollen from the anthers. In queens and workers this is then groomed into the corbiculae (pollen baskets) on the hind legs where it can be seen as bulging masses that may contain as many as a million pollen grains. Male bumblebees do not have corbiculae and do not purposively collect pollen. Bumblebees are also capable of buzz pollination, in which they dislodge pollen from the anthers by creating a resonant vibration with their flight muscles.

In at least some species, once a bumblebee has visited a flower, it leaves a scent mark on it. This scent mark deters bumblebees from visiting that flower until the scent degrades. This scent mark is a general chemical bouquet that bumblebees leave behind in different locations (e.g. nest, neutral, and food sites), and they learn to use this bouquet to identify both rewarding and unrewarding flowers, and may be able to identify who else has visited a flower. Bumblebees rely on this chemical bouquet more when the flower has a high handling time, that is, where it takes a longer time for the bee to find the nectar once inside the flower.

Once they have collected nectar and pollen, female workers return to the nest and deposit the harvest into brood cells, or into wax cells for storage. Unlike honeybees, bumblebees only store a few days' worth of food, so are much more vulnerable to food shortages. Male bumblebees collect only nectar and do so to feed themselves. They may visit quite different flowers from the workers because of their different nutritional needs.

=== Asynchronous flight muscles ===
Bees beat their wings about 200 times a second. Their thorax muscles do not contract on each nerve firing, but rather vibrate like a plucked rubber band. This is efficient, since it lets the system consisting of muscle and wing operate at its resonant frequency, leading to low energy consumption. Further, it is necessary, since insect motor nerves generally cannot fire 200 times per second. These types of muscles are called asynchronous muscles and are found in the insect wing systems in families such as Hymenoptera, Diptera, Coleoptera, and Hemiptera. Bumblebees must warm up their bodies considerably to get airborne at low ambient temperatures. Bumblebees can reach an internal thoracic temperature of 30 °C (86 °F) using this method.

=== Cuckoo bumblebees ===
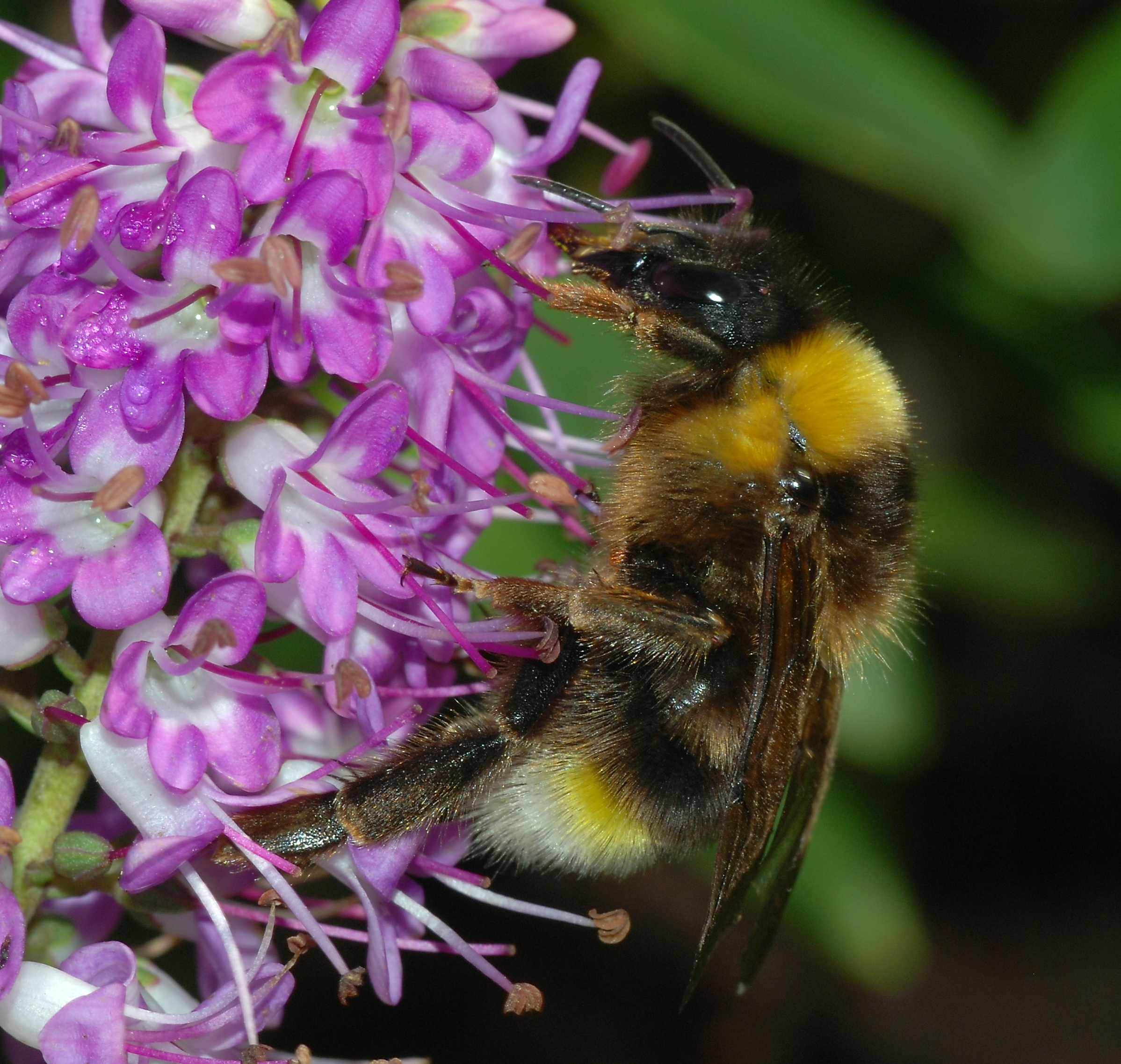
The cuckoo bumblebee B. vestalis, a parasite of B. terrestris

Bumblebees of the subgenus Psithyrus (known as 'cuckoo bumblebees', and formerly considered a separate genus) are brood parasites, sometimes called kleptoparasites, in the colonies of other bumblebees, and have lost the ability to collect pollen. Before finding and invading a host colony, a Psithyrus female, such as that of the Psithyrus species of B. sylvestris, feeds directly from flowers. Once she has infiltrated a host colony, the Psithyrus female kills or subdues the queen of that colony, and uses pheromones and physical attacks to force the workers of that colony to feed her and her young. Usually, cuckoo bumblebees can be described as queen-intolerant inquilines, since the host queen is often killed to enable the parasite to produce more offspring, though some species, such as B. bohemicus, actually enjoy increased success when they leave the host queen alive.

The female Psithyrus has a number of morphological adaptations for combat, such as larger mandibles, a tough cuticle and a larger venom sac that increase her chances of taking over a nest. Upon emerging from their cocoons, the Psithyrus males and females disperse and mate. The males do not survive the winter but, like nonparasitic bumblebee queens, Psithyrus females find suitable locations to spend the winter and enter diapause after mating. They usually emerge from hibernation later than their host species. Each species of cuckoo bumblebee has a specific host species, which it may physically resemble. In the case of the parasitism of B. terrestris by B. (Psithyrus) vestalis, genetic analysis of individuals captured in the wild showed that about 42% of the host species' nests at a single location (Note: The study location was the Botanical Garden Halle (Saale) in Germany, described as a flower-rich region with high and stable abundance of both host and cuckoo species. 24 B. terrestris workers and 24 drones were captured on foraging flights. 24 male B. vestalis were similarly captured. DNA analysis was used to estimate how many colonies these individuals came from.) had "[lost] their fight against their parasite".

=== Sting ===
Queen and worker bumblebees can sting. Unlike in honeybees, a bumblebee's stinger lacks barbs, so the bee can sting repeatedly without leaving the stinger in the wound and thereby injuring itself. Bumblebee species are not normally aggressive, but may sting in defence of their nest, or if harmed. Female cuckoo bumblebees aggressively attack host colony members, and sting the host queen, but ignore other animals unless disturbed.

== Predators, parasites, and pathogens ==
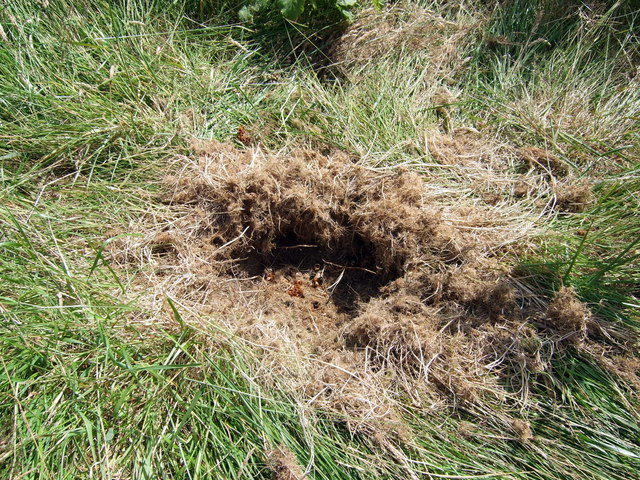
Bumblebee nest dug up and destroyed by a predator, probably a badger

Bumblebees, despite their ability to sting, are eaten by certain predators. Nests may be dug up by badgers and eaten whole, including any adults present. Adults are preyed upon by robber flies and beewolves in North America. In Europe, birds including bee-eaters and shrikes capture adult bumblebees on the wing; smaller birds such as great tits also occasionally learn to take bumblebees, while camouflaged crab spiders catch them as they visit flowers.

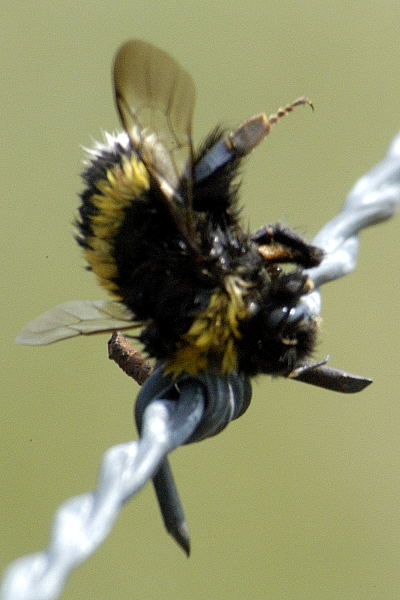
Bumblebee stored as food by a great grey shrike

The great grey shrike is able to detect flying bumblebees up to 100 m (330 ft) away; once captured, the sting is removed by repeatedly squeezing the insect with the mandibles and wiping the abdomen on a branch. The European honey buzzard follows flying bees back to their nest, digs out the nest with its feet, and eats larvae, pupae and adults as it finds them.

Bumblebees are parasitised by tracheal mites, Locustacarus buchneri; protozoans including Crithidia bombi and Apicystis bombi; and microsporidians including Nosema bombi and Nosema ceranae. The tree bumblebee B. hypnorum has spread into the United Kingdom despite hosting high levels of a nematode that normally interferes with queen bees' attempts to establish colonies. Deformed wing virus has been found to affect 11% of bumblebees in Great Britain.

Female bee moths (Aphomia sociella) prefer to lay their eggs in bumblebee nests. The A. sociella larvae will then feed on the eggs, larvae, and pupae left unprotected by the bumblebees, sometimes destroying large parts of the nest.

== Relationship to humans ==
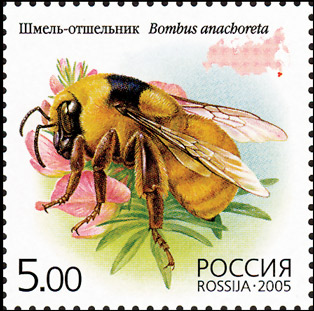
Bumblebees and human culture: Bombus anachoreta on a Russian postage stamp, 2005

=== Agricultural use ===
Bumblebees are important pollinators of both crops and wildflowers. Because bumblebees do not overwinter the entire colony, they do not stockpile honey, and therefore are not useful as honey producers. Bumblebees are increasingly cultured for agricultural use as pollinators, among other reasons because they can pollinate plants such as tomato in greenhouses by buzz pollination whereas other pollinators cannot. Commercial production began in 1987, when Roland De Jonghe founded the Biobest company; in 1988 they produced enough nests to pollinate 40 hectares of tomatoes. The industry grew quickly, starting with other companies in the Netherlands. Bumblebee nests, mainly of buff-tailed bumblebees, are produced in at least 30 factories around the world; over a million nests are grown annually in Europe; Turkey is a major producer.

Bumblebees are Northern Hemisphere animals. When red clover was introduced as a crop to New Zealand in the nineteenth century, it was found to have no local pollinators, and clover seed had accordingly to be imported each year. Four species of bumblebee from the United Kingdom were therefore imported as pollinators. In 1885 and 1886, the Canterbury Acclimatization Society brought in 442 queens, of which 93 survived and quickly multiplied. As planned, red clover was soon being produced from locally-grown seed. Bumblebees are also reared commercially to pollinate tomatoes grown in greenhouses. The New Zealand population of buff-tailed bumblebees began colonising Tasmania, 1,500 miles (2,400 km) away, after being introduced there in 1992 under unclear circumstances.

Some concerns exist about the impact of the international trade in mass-produced bumblebee colonies. Evidence from Japan and South America indicates bumblebees can escape and naturalise in new environments, causing damage to native pollinators. Greater use of native pollinators, such as Bombus ignitus in China and Japan, has occurred as a result. In addition, mounting evidence indicates mass-produced bumblebees may also carry diseases, harmful to wild bumblebees and honeybees.

In Canada and Sweden, it has been shown that growing a mosaic of different crops encourages bumblebees and provides higher yields than does a monoculture of oilseed rape, despite the fact that the bees were attracted to the crop.

=== Population decline ===
Bumblebee species are declining in Europe, North America, and Asia due to a number of factors, including land-use change that reduces their food plants. In North America, pathogens are possibly having a stronger negative effect especially for the subgenus Bombus. A major impact on bumblebees was caused by the mechanisation of agriculture, accelerated by the urgent need to increase food production during the Second World War. Small farms depended on horses to pull implements and carts. The horses were fed on clover and hay, both of which were permanently grown on a typical farm. Little artificial fertiliser was used. Farms thus provided flowering clover and flower-rich meadows, favouring bumblebees. Mechanisation removed the need for horses and most of the clover; artificial fertilisers encouraged the growth of taller grasses, outcompeting the meadow flowers. Most of the flowers, and the bumblebees that fed on them, disappeared from Britain by the early 1980s. The last native British short-haired bumblebee was captured near Dungeness in 1988. This significant increase in pesticide and fertilizer use associated with the industrialization of agriculture has had adverse effects on the genus Bombus. The bees are directly exposed to the chemicals in two ways: by consuming nectar that has been directly treated with pesticide, or through physical contact with treated plants and flowers. The species Bombus hortorum in particular has been found to be affected by the pesticides; their brood development has been reduced and their memory has been negatively affected. Additionally, pesticide use negatively affects colony development and size.

Bumblebees are in danger in many developed countries due to habitat destruction and collateral pesticide damage. The European Food Safety Authority ruled that three neonicotinoid pesticides (clothianidin, imidacloprid, and thiamethoxam) presented a high risk for bees. While most work on neonicotinoid toxicity has looked at honeybees, a study on B. terrestris showed that "field-realistic" levels of imidacloprid significantly reduced growth rate and cut production of new queens by 85%, implying a "considerable negative effect" on wild bumblebee populations throughout the developed world. Another study on B. terrestris had results suggesting that use of neonicotinoid pesticides can affect how well bumblebees are able to forage and pollinate. Foragers from bee colonies that had been affected by the pesticide took longer to learn to manipulate flowers and visited flowers with less nutritious pollen. In another study, chronic exposure in a laboratory setting to field-realistic levels of the neonicotinoid pesticide thiamethoxam did not affect colony weight gain or the number or mass of sexuals produced. Low levels of neonicotinoids can reduce the number of bumblebees in a colony by as much as 55%, and cause dysfunction in the bumblebees' brains. The Bumblebee Conservation Trust considers this evidence of reduced brain function "particularly alarming given that bumblebees rely upon their intelligence to go about their daily tasks."

Of 19 species of native nestmaking bumblebees and six species of cuckoo bumblebees formerly widespread in Britain, three have been extirpated, eight are in serious decline, and only six remain widespread. Similar declines have been reported in Ireland, with four species designated endangered, and another two considered vulnerable to extinction. A decline in bumblebee numbers could cause large-scale changes to the countryside, resulting from inadequate pollination of certain plants.

Some bumblebees native to North America are also vanishing, such as Bombus balteatus, Bombus terricola, Bombus affinis, and Bombus occidentalis; one, Bombus franklini, may be extinct. In South America, Bombus bellicosus was extirpated in the northern limit of its distribution range, probably due to intense land use and climate change effects.

=== Conservation efforts ===
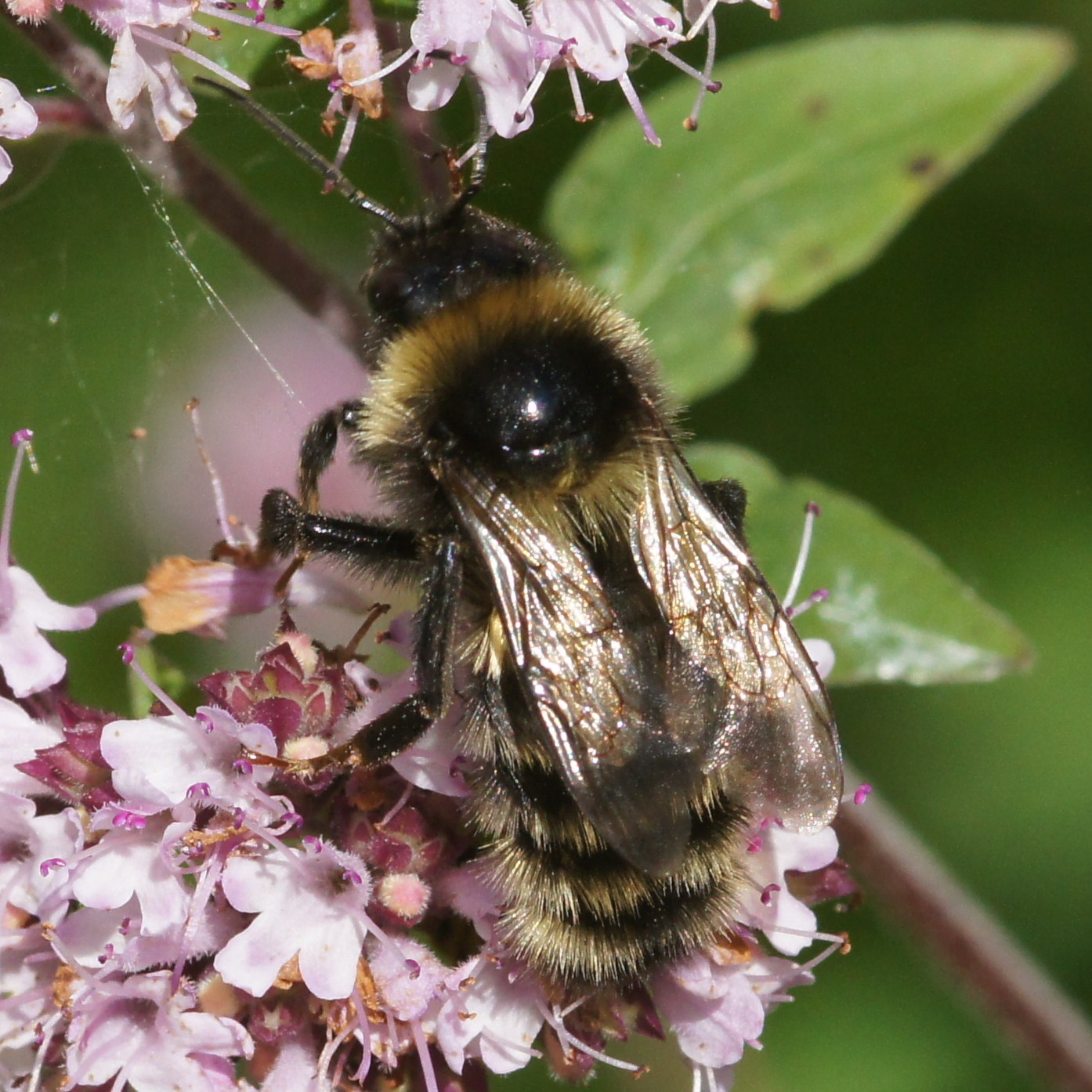
Drone short-haired bumblebee, Bombus subterraneus. The species was successfully reintroduced to England from Sweden.

In 2006, the bumblebee researcher Dave Goulson founded a registered charity, the Bumblebee Conservation Trust, to prevent the extinction "of any of the UK's bumblebees." In 2009 and 2010, the Trust attempted to reintroduce the short-haired bumblebee, Bombus subterraneus, which had become extinct in Britain, from the British-derived populations surviving in New Zealand from their introduction there a century earlier. From 2011, the Trust, in partnership with Natural England, Hymettus and the RSPB, has reintroduced short-haired bumblebee queens from Skåne in southern Sweden to restored flower-rich meadows at Dungeness in Kent. The queens were checked for mites and American foulbrood disease. Agri-environment schemes spread across the neighbouring area of Romney Marsh have been set up to provide over 800 hectares of additional flower-rich habitat for the bees. By the summer of 2013, workers of the species were found near the release zone, proving that nests had been established. The restored habitat has produced a revival in at least five "Schedule 41 priority" species: the ruderal bumblebee, Bombus ruderatus; the red-shanked carder bee, Bombus ruderarius; the shrill carder bee, Bombus sylvarum; the brown-banded carder bee, Bombus humilis and the moss carder bee, Bombus muscorum.

The world's first bumblebee sanctuary was established at Vane Farm in the Loch Leven National Nature Reserve in Scotland in 2008. In 2011, London's Natural History Museum led the establishment of an International Union for Conservation of Nature Bumblebee Specialist Group, chaired by Dr. Paul H. Williams, to assess the threat status of bumblebee species worldwide using Red List criteria.

Bumblebee conservation is in its infancy in many parts of the world, but with the realization of the important part they play in pollination of crops, efforts are being made to manage farmland better. Enhancing the wild bee population can be done by the planting of wildflower strips, and in New Zealand, bee nesting boxes have achieved some success, perhaps because there are few burrowing mammals to provide potential nesting sites in that country.

=== Misconception about flight ===
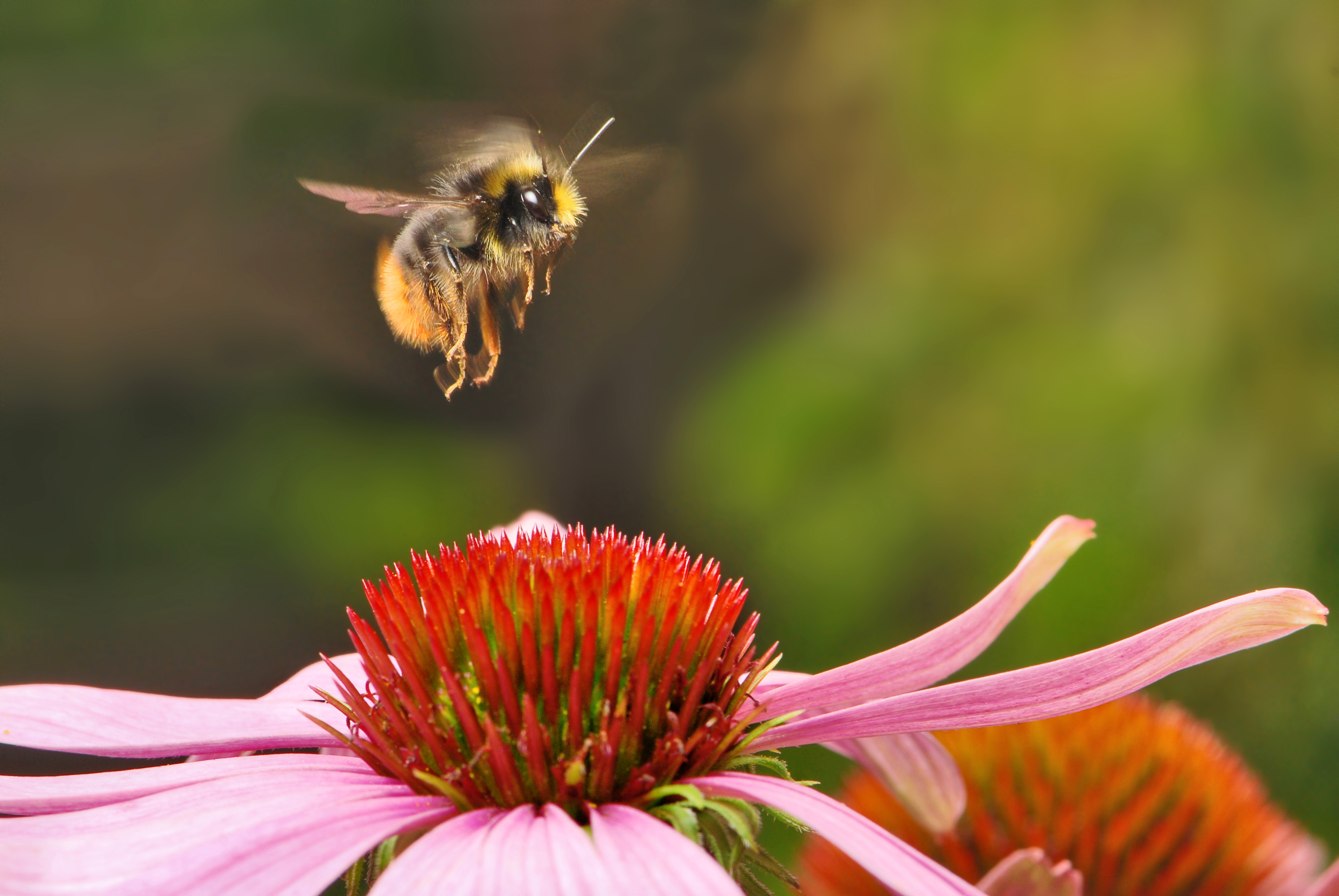
A widely believed falsehood holds that scientists proved bumblebees to be incapable of flight.

Slow motion video of a bumblebee in flight, 1/32 speed

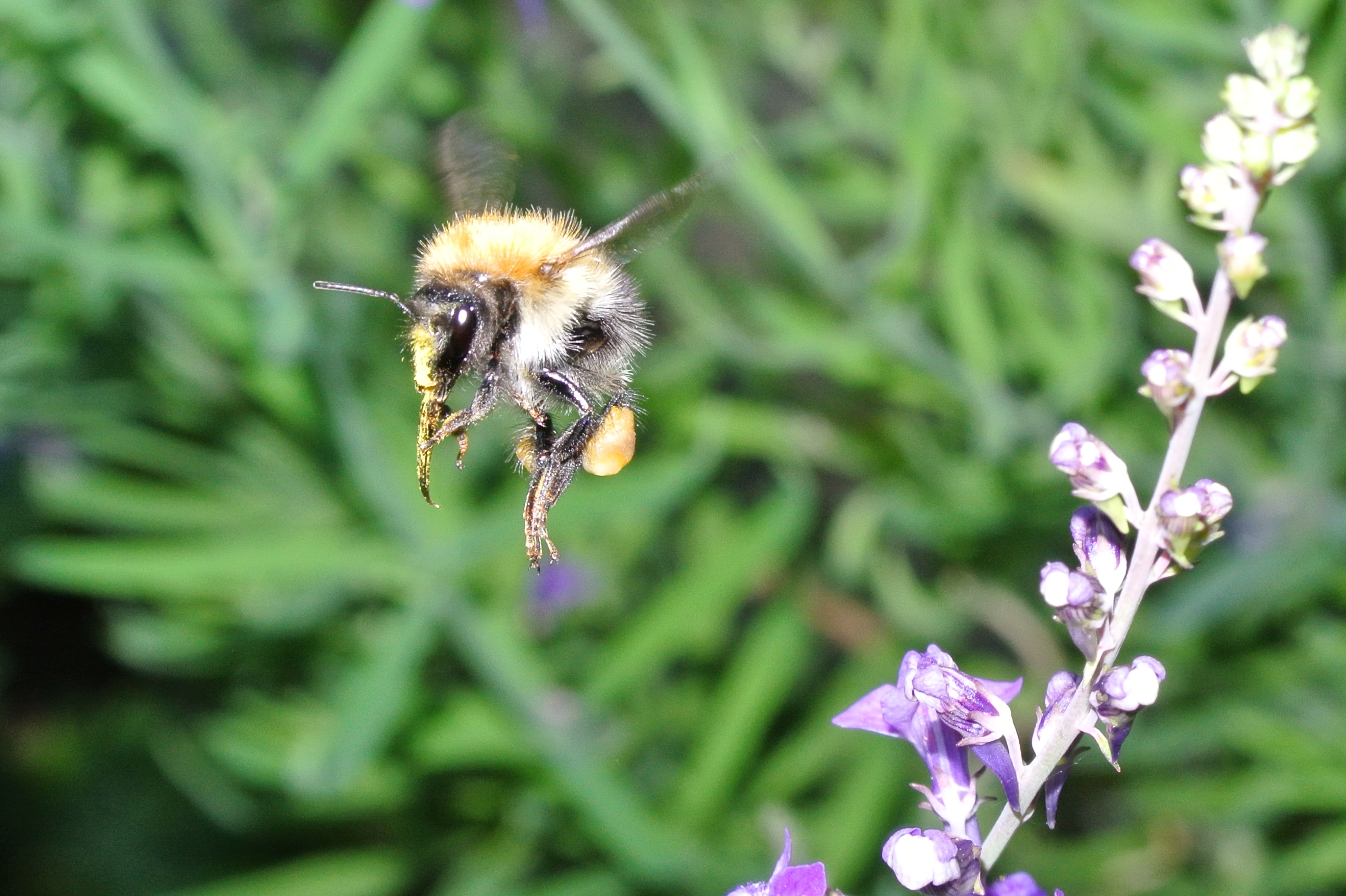
Bumblebee in flight. It has its tongue extended and a laden pollen basket.

According to 20th-century folklore, the laws of aerodynamics prove the bumblebee should be incapable of flight, as it does not have the capacity (in terms of wing size or beats per second) to achieve flight with the degree of wing loading necessary.

'Supposedly someone did a back of the envelope calculation, taking the weight of a bumblebee and its wing area into account, and worked out that if it only flies at a couple of metres per second, the wings wouldn't produce enough lift to hold the bee up,' explains Charlie Ellington, Professor of Animal Mechanics at Cambridge University.

The origin of this claim has been difficult to pin down with any certainty. John H. McMasters recounted an anecdote about an unnamed Swiss aerodynamicist at a dinner party who performed some rough calculations and concluded, presumably in jest, that according to the equations, bumblebees cannot fly.

In later years, McMasters backed away from this origin, suggesting there could be multiple sources, and stating that the earliest he had found was a reference in the 1934 book Le Vol des Insectes by French entomologist Antoine Magnan (1881–1938). Magnan had applied the equations of air resistance to insects, giving the result that their flight would be impossible, but "One shouldn't be surprised that the results of the calculations don't square with reality". The following passage appears in the introduction to Le Vol des Insectes:

Tout d'abord poussé par ce qui se fait en aviation, j'ai appliqué aux insectes les lois de la résistance de l'air, et je suis arrivé avec M. Sainte-Laguë à cette conclusion que leur vol est impossible. [...] Or, il y a un fait, c'est que l'insecte vole et qu'il sustente son poids à chaque instant. Il n'y a pas lieu toutefois de s'étonner de ce que les résultats fournis par le calcul ne soient pas en accord avec la réalité. La discordance tient à ce que, à l'heure actuelle, nous ne savons pas quelles sont les qualités aérodynamiques d'une aile d'insecte, à bord antérieur épais et rigide, à bord postérieur souple et mince, sorte de plan constitué souvent par des rigoles dont on ne connaît pas encore très bien le rôle, malgré les expériences que j'ai effectuées à ce sujet.

Translation:

First prompted by what is done in aviation, I applied the laws of air resistance to insects, and I arrived, with Mr. Sainte-Laguë, at this conclusion that their flight is impossible. [...] Still, the fact remains that the insect flies and supports its weight at every moment. There is therefore no reason to be surprised that the results provided by calculation do not agree with reality. The discrepancy arises from the fact that, at present, we do not know what the aerodynamic properties of an insect wing are—one with a thick and rigid leading edge and a flexible, thin trailing edge, a kind of surface often formed by grooves whose role is still not well understood, despite the experiments I have carried out on this subject.

Magnan refers to his assistant André Sainte-Laguë. Some credit physicist Ludwig Prandtl (1875–1953) of the University of Göttingen in Germany with popularizing the idea. Others say Swiss gas dynamicist Jakob Ackeret (1898–1981) did the calculations.

The calculations that purported to show that bumblebees cannot fly are based upon a simplified linear treatment of oscillating aerofoils. The method assumes small amplitude oscillations without flow separation. This ignores the effect of dynamic stall (an airflow separation inducing a large vortex above the wing), which briefly produces several times the lift of the aerofoil in regular flight. More sophisticated aerodynamic analysis shows the bumblebee can fly because its wings encounter dynamic stall in every oscillation cycle.

The evolutionary biologist John Maynard Smith pointed out that bumblebees would not be expected to sustain flight, as they would need to generate too much power given their tiny wing area. However, in aerodynamics experiments with other insects, he found that viscosity at the scale of small insects meant even their small wings can move a very large volume of air relative to their size, and this reduces the power required to sustain flight by an order of magnitude.

=== In music and literature ===
Flight of the Bumblebee
Nikolai Rimsky-Korsakov's 1900 "Flight of the Bumblebee" performed by the US Army Band

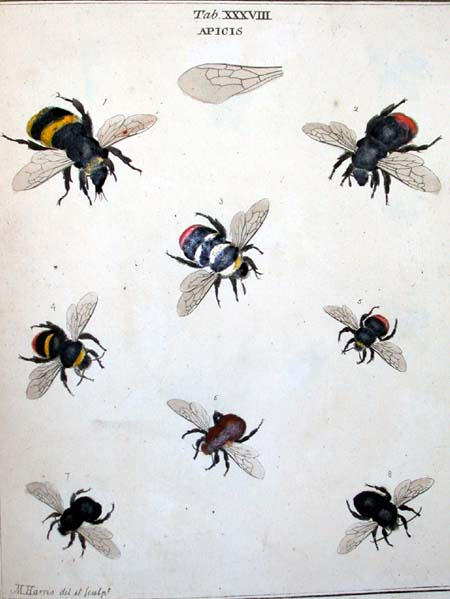
Bumblebees of different species illustrated by Moses Harris in his 1782 Exposition of English Insects

The orchestral interlude "Flight of the Bumblebee" was composed (c. 1900) by Nikolai Rimsky-Korsakov. It represents the turning of Prince Guidon into a bumblebee so he can fly away to visit his father, Tsar Saltan, in the opera The Tale of Tsar Saltan, although the music may reflect the flight of a bluebottle rather than a bumblebee. The music inspired Walt Disney to feature a bumblebee in his 1940 animated musical Fantasia and have it sound as if it were flying in all parts of the theater. This early attempt at "surround sound" was excluded from the film in later showings.

In 1599, during the reign of Queen Elizabeth I, someone, possibly Tailboys Dymoke, published Caltha Poetarum: Or The Bumble Bee, under the pseudonym "T. Cutwode". This was one of nine books censored under the Bishops' Ban issued by the Archbishop of Canterbury John Whitgift and the Bishop of London Richard Bancroft.

Emily Dickinson made a bumblebee the subject of her parody of Isaac Watts's well-known poem about honeybees, "How Doth the Little Busy Bee" (1715). Where Watts wrote "How skilfully she builds her cell! How neat she spreads the wax!", Dickinson's poem, "The Bumble-Bee's Religion" (1881), begins "His little Hearse-like Figure / Unto itself a Dirge / To a delusive Lilac / The vanity divulge / Of Industry and Morals / And every righteous thing / For the divine Perdition / of Idleness and Spring." The letter is said to have enclosed a dead bee.

In 1847, Ralph Waldo Emerson published his poem "The Humble-Bee".

The entomologist Otto Plath wrote Bumblebees and Their Ways in 1934. His daughter, the poet Sylvia Plath, wrote a group of poems about bees late in 1962, within four months of her suicide, transforming her father's interest into her poetry.

The scientist and illustrator Moses Harris (1731–1785) painted accurate watercolour drawings of bumblebees in his An Exposition of English Insects Including the Several Classes of Neuroptera, Hymenoptera, & Diptera, or Bees, Flies, & Libellulae (1776–80).

The surname Dumbledore in the Harry Potter series (1997–2007) is an old name for bumblebee. J. K. Rowling said the name "seemed to suit the headmaster, because one of his passions is music and I imagined him walking around humming to himself". J. R. R. Tolkien, in his poem "Errantry", used the term 'Dumbledor' for a bumblebee. Among Beatrix Potter's "little books", Babbity Bumble and other members of her nest appear in her 1910 The Tale of Mrs. Tittlemouse.

== See also ==
- Melittology (also known as apiology) – the study of bees
- Ophrys bombyliflora – the bumblebee orchid

== Sources ==
- Goulson, Dave (2003). Bumblebees: Their Behaviour and Ecology. Oxford University Press. ISBN 0-19-852607-5.
- Goulson, Dave (2013). A Sting in the Tale. Jonathan Cape.
- Macdonald, Murdo (2003). "Bumblebees" (PDF). Scottish Natural Heritage. Archived from the original (PDF) on 3 March 2016.
- Macdonald, Murdo & Nisbet, G. (2006). Highland Bumblebees: Distribution, Ecology and Conservation. Highland Biological Recording Group (HBRG). ISBN 0-9552211-0-2. Supplement 2 (2007; updates the book further from Supplement 1).
- Michener, C.D. (2000). The Bees of the World. Johns Hopkins University Press.
- Schweitzer, Dale F. et al. (2012). Conservation and Management of North American Bumble Bees. Washington D.C.: U.S. Forest Service.
