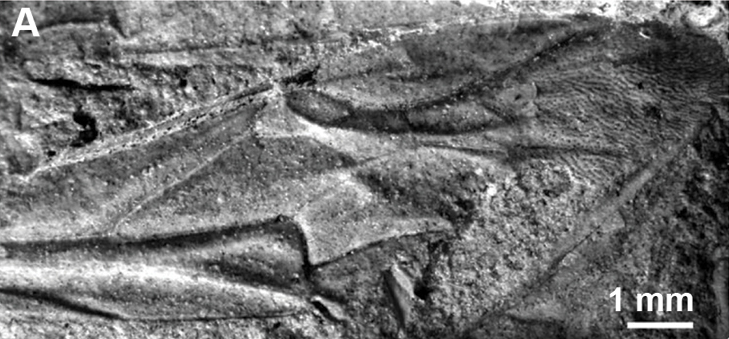
- Oligobombus cuspidatus holotype wing

Scientific classification
- Domain: Eukaryota
- Kingdom: Animalia
- Phylum: Arthropoda
- Class: Insecta
- Order: Hymenoptera
- Family: Apidae
- Clade: Corbiculata
- Tribe: Bombini
- Genus: †Oligobombus; Antropov, 2014
- Species: †O. cuspidatus

Binomial name
- †Oligobombus cuspidatus Antropov, 2014

= Oligobombus =

Oligobombus Temporal range: Priabonian ~37–34 Ma

Extinct species of bumblebee relatives

Oligobombus is an extinct genus of bumblebee relatives in the tribe Bombini, containing the single species Oligobombus cuspidatus. The genus and species were described by Antropov (2014) based on a single fore-wing from the Late Eocene Bembridge Marls Insect Bed on the Isle of Wight, England. The fossil was described by re-examining a specimen in the Smith Collection. The collection was originally made by A'Court Smith, and purchased by the Natural History Museum in 1877 and 1883.
