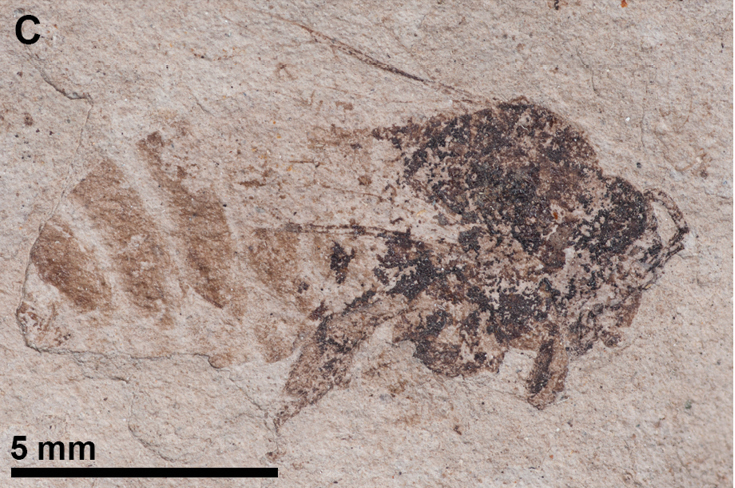
- Calyptapis florissantensis 1908 specimen

Scientific classification
- Domain: Eukaryota
- Kingdom: Animalia
- Phylum: Arthropoda
- Class: Insecta
- Order: Hymenoptera
- Family: Apidae
- Genus: †Calyptapis
- Species: †C. florissantensis

Binomial name
- †Calyptapis florissantensis Cockerell, 1906

= Calyptapis =

Calyptapis Temporal range: Chadronian 34–34 Ma

Extinct genus of bees

Calyptapis is an extinct bombini genus related to bumblebees with one described species Calyptapis florissantensis. It is known only from the Late Eocene Chadronian age shales of the Florissant Formation in Colorado. The genus and species were described by Theodore Dru Alison Cockerell in 1906.
