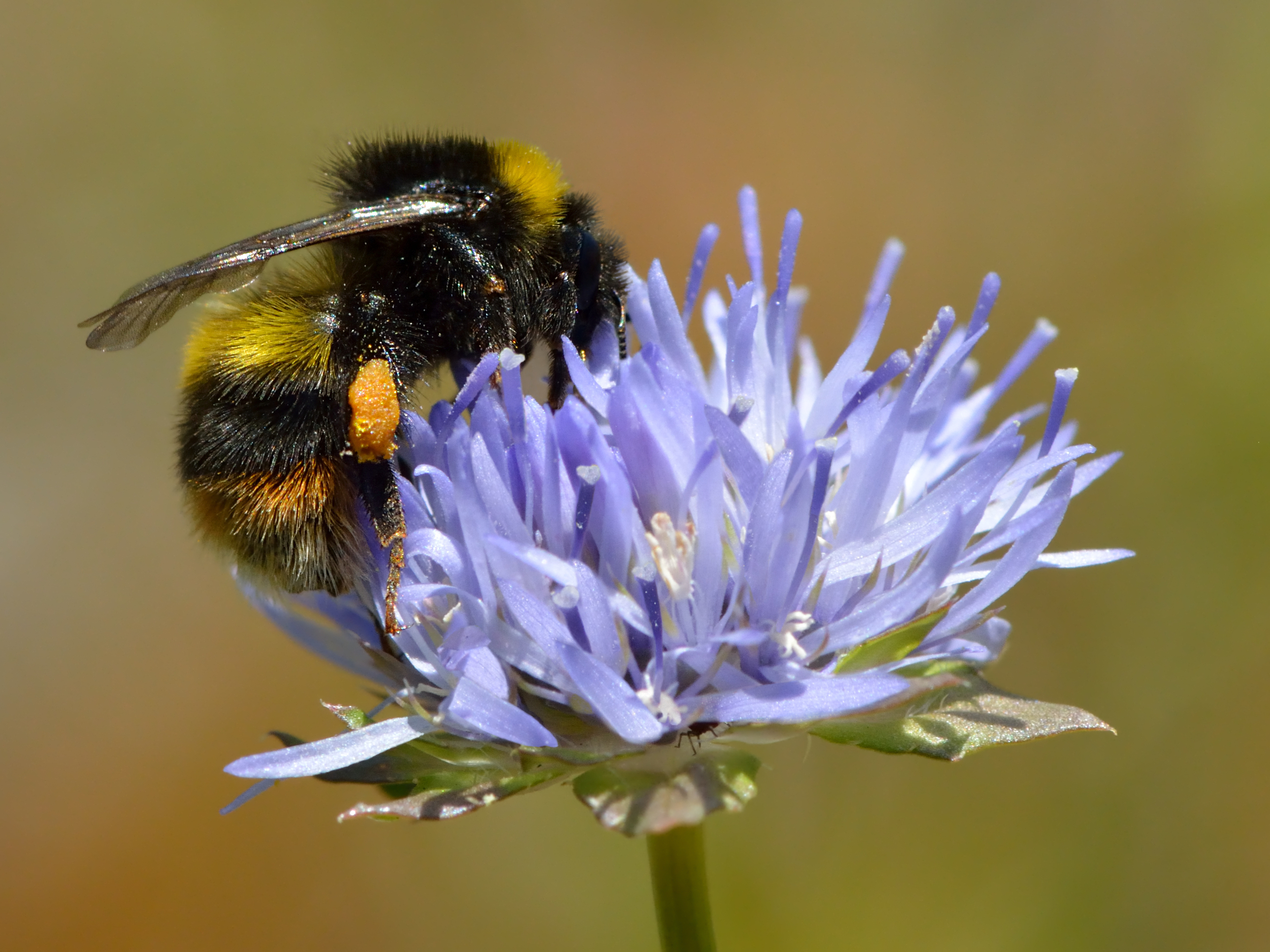
- subsp. soroeensis
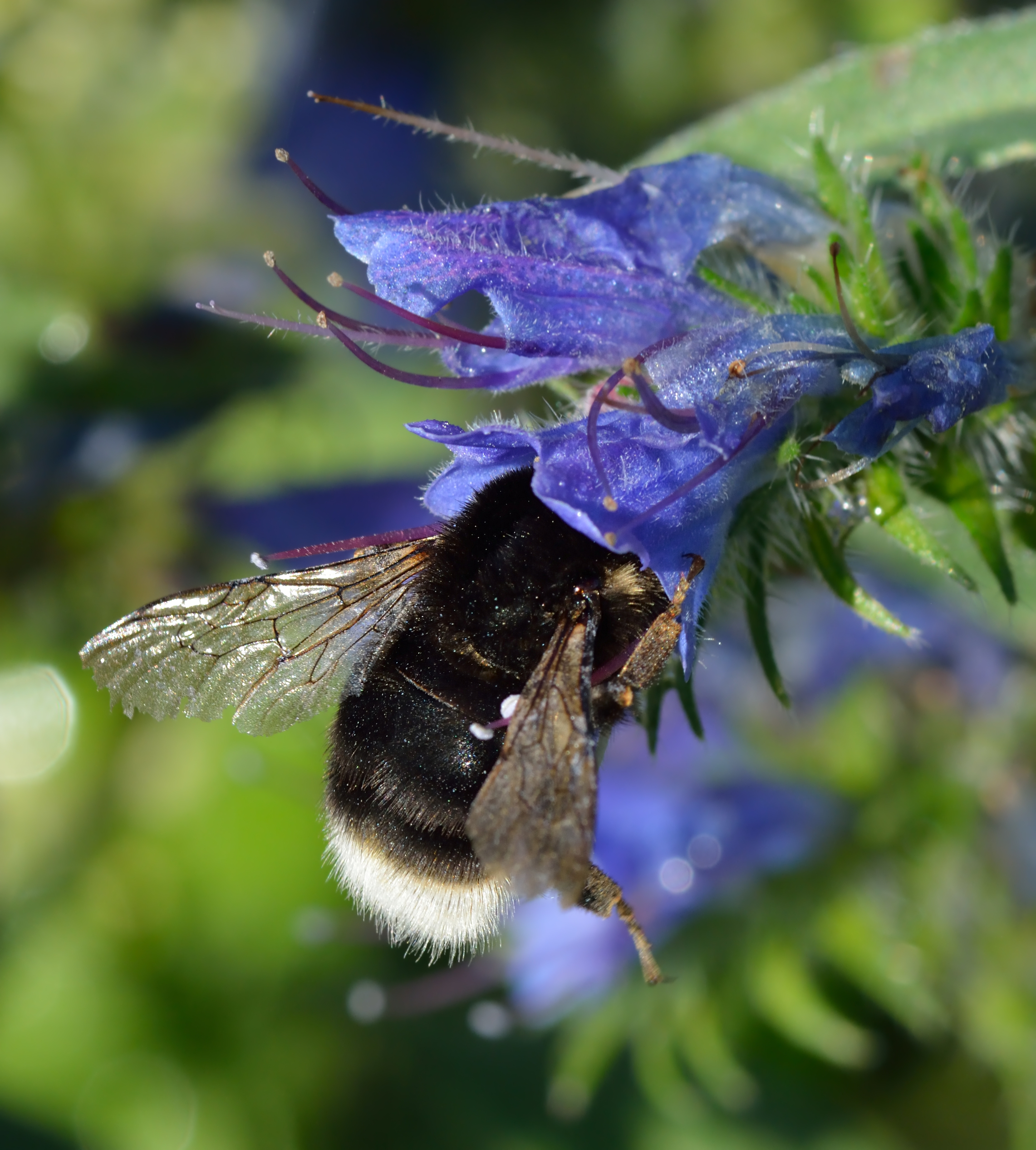
- subsp. proteus

Conservation status
- Least Concern (IUCN 3.1)

Scientific classification
- Domain: Eukaryota
- Kingdom: Animalia
- Phylum: Arthropoda
- Class: Insecta
- Order: Hymenoptera
- Family: Apidae
- Genus: Bombus
- Subgenus: Kallobombus
- Species: B. soroeensis

Binomial name
- Bombus soroeensis (Fabricius, 1777)

= Broken-belted bumblebee =

Species of bee

The broken-belted bumblebee or Ilfracombe bumblebee (Bombus soroeensis) is a species of bumblebee present in most of Europe and parts of Asia.

== Description ==
This relatively small bumblebee has a rather oblong face and a proboscis of medium length. The body of the female is black with two yellow bands, one at the collar, one at the second tergite (abdominal segment). The latter often has black hair in the middle, thus dividing it into two. In males, the yellow abdominal band is broader, and usually covers most of the first tergite, as well as the second. On both sexes, the tail is white, often mixed with orange-yellow hairs. On the northern Scottish form, the female usually has an entirely white tail. Melanic forms can be found on the European continent. The bee reaches an average length of 16 mm (0.63 in) (queen, wingspan 30 mm (1.2 in)), 12 mm (0.47 in) (worker), and 13 mm (0.51 in) (male).

== Ecology ==
The nest, which at most has about 80 to 150 workers, is usually underground. At least in Britain, the bumblebee seems to favour uplands, heaths, and grasslands. Favourite flowers are clovers, ling, harebell and Scabiosa as bird's-foot trefoils.

== Distribution ==
In Eurasia, this bumblebee is present from 70ºN in Scandinavia and 65ºN in Siberia in the north to the Alps, the Pyrenees, the Sierra de Ancares (Spain) and the Balkans in the south. In the west, its distribution reaches the British mainland (including Skye and some minor Scottish islands, but excluding Ireland and the major Scottish islands), while in the east it extends to Lake Baykal in central Siberia, Mongolia, and, in the south-east, Anatolia and the northern Iranian mountains. In southern Britain, it has declined considerably since around 1960 and is now confined to spotty occurrences in west Wales, Cornwall with adjoining counties, northern England, Scotland, and an isolated location in Kent.
