= John H. McMasters =

John H. McMasters (April 26, 1939 – February 13, 2008) was an aeronautical engineer notable for his contributions to aerodynamics and engineering education.

== Early life and education ==
McMasters was born in Taft, California and fell in love with airplanes in 1943 when his uncle gave him a private "air show" in a Lockheed P-38 Lightning. After completing high school, he went on to earn BS and MS degrees from the University of Colorado at Boulder in 1960 and 1962 and a PhD from Purdue University in 1975, all in Aeronautical Engineering.

== Early career and Ph.D. ==
After having completed his BS and MS on a ROTC scholarship, he entered the US Air Force as a 1st Lt Working at the US Air Force Special Weapons Center (later the Air Force Weapons Lab) at Kirtland Air Force Base in New Mexico, he was given the opportunity to develop a guided missile eventually given the provisional designation ZAIM-68A Quetzalcoatl. In 1965 he left the US Air Force to attend Purdue University and work on his PhD. In 1971 and 1972 he taught at Arizona State University. As there were few jobs available at time in aerospace, he worked from 1972 to 1974 as a tent designer at Camp Trails Company in Phoenix Arizona, while at the same time working on his PhD dissertation. In 1975 he returned to Purdue to finish his PhD.

== Later career ==
In 1976, having completed graduate school, he took a job working at Boeing Commercial Airplanes as a research aerodynamicist and worked there until his death. John became an Associate Technical Fellow at Boeing in 1995 and a Technical Fellow in 1996. Starting in 1994 he was a member of what has become the Boeing Company Offices level University Relations Process Council. In this capacity he was instrumental in establishing and conducting the Boeing-Welliver Faculty Summer Fellowship, Boeing Fellow on Campus, and Boeing Outstanding Educator Programs. He was also one of the original architects of the Boeing-initiated Industry-University-Government Roundtable for Enhancing Engineering Education (IUGREEE). Beginning in 1990, he also served as an Affiliate [Adjunct] Professor in the Department of Aeronautics and Astronautics at the University of Washington and he was also a member of the External Advisory Board of the Department of Aerospace Engineering Sciences at the University of Colorado at Boulder.

At the time of his death, John was a program manager on the staff of Ed Wells Initiative, a joint program between Boeing and the Society of Professional Engineering Employees in Aerospace charged with enhancing the technical excellence of the SPEEA-represented Boeing technical workforce.

== Research ==
His professional and avocational interests ran together over a broad range of topics including: low-speed/highlift aerodynamics, airplane design, Reynolds number scale conditions in wind tunnel testing, soaring and human powered flight technology, bioaerodynamics, paleontology, and engineering education. He authored over 90 publications and technical papers, and lectured to a broad range of university, government, and professional society audiences in all these topic areas. John made significant contributions in a variety of aerodynamic and aircraft design areas, including high-lift aerodynamics, sailplanes, vortex generators, very large aircraft design, undersea gliders, smart wings, and many other concepts.

== Awards and memberships ==
John was an Associate Fellow of the American Institute of Aeronautics and Astronautics, and served as an AIAA Distinguished Lecturer, from 1992 to 1994 and again from 2002 to 2006. In 2002, he was named an Outstanding Aerospace Engineer by the School of Aeronautics and Astronautics at Purdue University. He was awarded the 29th SAE/AIAA Littlewood Memorial Lectureship, 2004 and was selected as a Sigma Xi Distinguished Lecturer for 2005-07.

== Personal life ==
John was married to Marie from September 1960 to the time of his death. Together, they had two children.

John served for five years on the Vashon Island, Washington School Board.
