= Radar guidance =

Radar guidance or radar-guided may refer to:

- Active radar guidance
- Semi-active radar guidance
- Passive radar guidance
- Radar altimeter guidance
