= James Hope Stewart =

Scottish factor and illustrator (1789–1856)

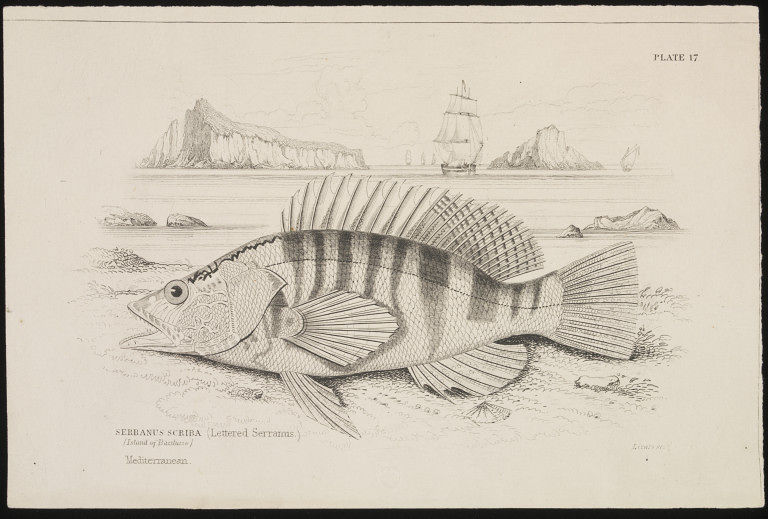
Drawing of a 'Lettered Serramus' (Serranus scriba) by James Hope Stewart for Sir William Jardine's The Naturalist's Library, 1833–1843.

James Hope Stewart of Slodahill (2 August 1789 – 20 July 1856) was a Scottish natural history artist, known for his paintings for Sir William Jardine's 40 volume series The Naturalist's Library.

== Life and work ==
Stewart was born on 2 August 1789 at Hillside, son of William Stewart of Hillhead. About 1816 he married Helen Bell (1792-1864); they lived at Gillenbie, Applegarthtown in Dumfries and Galloway, and had twelve children, ten sons and two daughters. He was the farmer and factor on a farm of 2,000 acres; he employed 3 men and 4 labourers on the farm, and 4 servants in the farmhouse.

There is confusion in the literature with a different James Stewart (engraver) (1791-1863), an artist in the Royal Scottish Academy from 1829, who emigrated to South Africa in 1833 and died there.

=== Illustrations for The Naturalist's Library ===
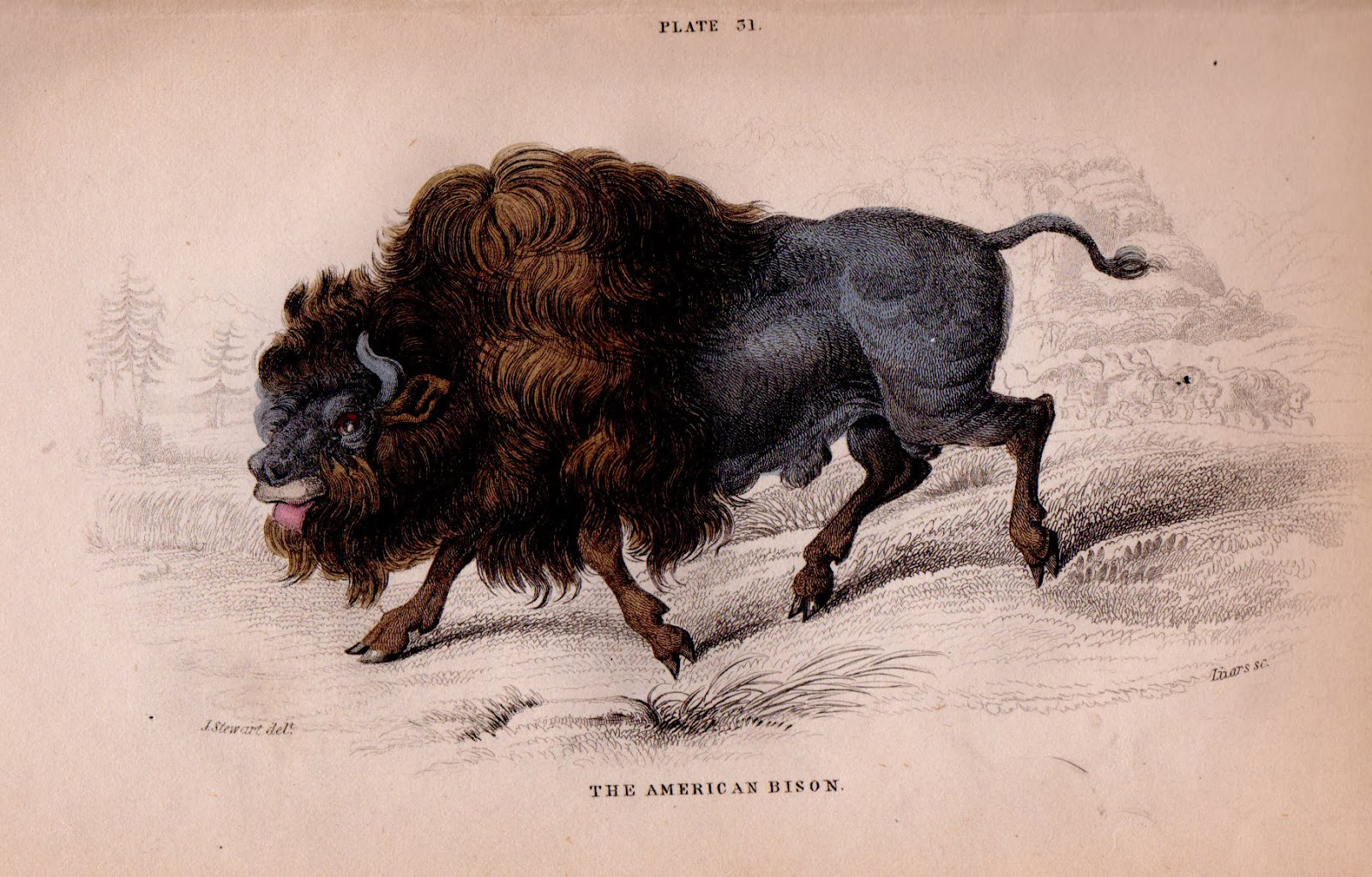
Watercolour drawing "The American Bison" by James Hope Stewart, 1836. Stewart had never seen a living bison.

Stewart is best known for his work preparing a long series of natural history illustrations for Sir William Jardine's 40 volume The Naturalist's Library. The 40 volumes of this encyclopedic work were published between 1833 and 1843. The subjects covered included birds, mammals, fish, and insects, each volume typically being devoted to a group such as Hummingbirds, Cetaceans, British Fishes, or Moths.

Stewart made and signed watercolour drawings for 213 mammal plates, 177 bird plates, 140 fish plates and 15 insect plates, a total of 545 under his name, in 28 volumes of The Naturalist's Library. Many other plates in the series are in similar style and apparently by Stewart, but are unsigned. A number of the plates were engraved by William Home Lizars (1788-1859) from Stewart's drawings. Stewart may have added background detail to further plates by other artists such as Edward Lear.

According to Jardine's biographers, Christine Jackson and Peter Davis, another publisher, Captain Thomas Brown recognised from the publication of the first volume in 1833 that "James Stewart's illustrations were going to make the series very attractive", and Brown attempted to lure Stewart to work on his rival series, "Miscellany of Natural History" for "any price he cared to name"; but Stewart chose to remain loyal to Jardine. It is also recorded that Stewart disliked having to paint mammals, but was prevailed upon by Lizars to draw a St Bernard dog for Sir Thomas Lauder.
