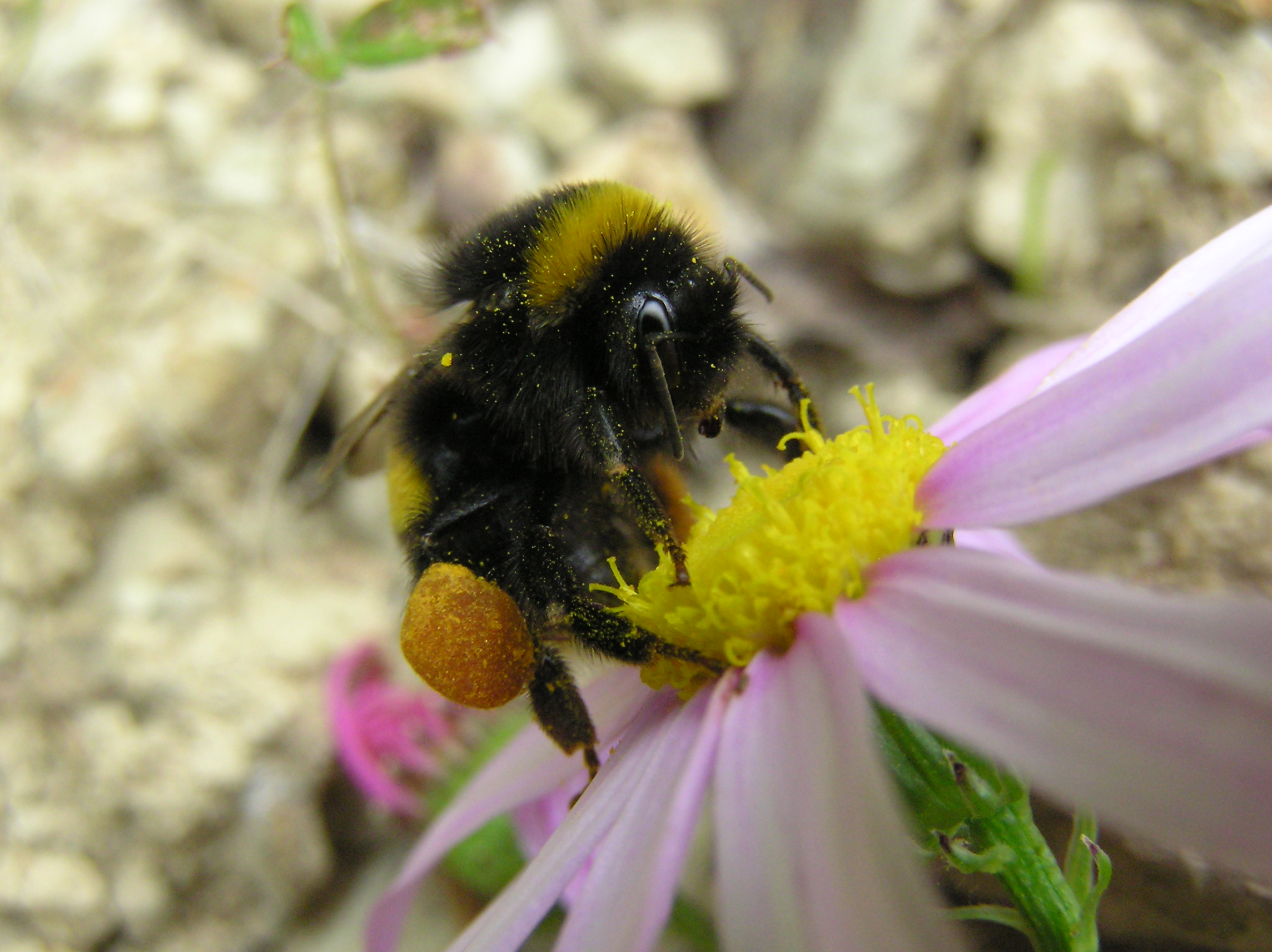
- Bombus species

Scientific classification
- Kingdom: Animalia
- Phylum: Arthropoda
- Clade: Pancrustacea
- Class: Insecta
- Order: Hymenoptera
- Family: Apidae
- Subfamily: Apinae
- Clade: Corbiculata
- Tribe: Bombini; Latreille 1802

Genera
- Bombus; † Calyptapis; † Oligobombus

= Bombini =

Tribe of bees

The Bombini are a tribe of large bristly apid bees which feed on pollen or nectar. Many species are social, forming nests of up to a few hundred individuals; other species, formerly classified as Psithyrus cuckoo bees, are brood parasites of nest-making species. The tribe contains a single living genus, Bombus, the bumblebees, and some extinct genera such as Calyptapis and Oligobombus. The tribe was described by Pierre André Latreille in 1802.

== Fossils ==
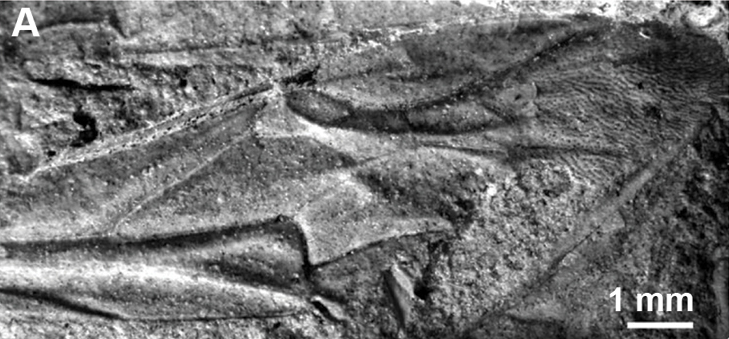
Oligobombus cuspidatus

Bombus cerdanyensis was described from Late Miocene lacustrine beds of La Cerdanya, Spain in 2014.

Calyptapis florissantensis was described by Theodore Dru Alison Cockerell in 1906 from the Chadronian (Eocene) lacustrine – large shale of Florissant in the US.

Oligobombus cuspidatus was described by Antropov et al (2014) from the Late Eocene Insect Bed of the Bembridge Marls on the Isle of Wight, England. The holotype fossil was described by re-examining a specimen in the Smith Collection.

== Sources ==
- C. D. Michener (2000) The Bees of the World, Johns Hopkins University Press.
