= Carder bee =

The term carder bee is a popular name applied to various bees, including:

- the common carder bee Bombus pascuorum, a European bumblebee
  - also Bombus humilis, Bombus muscorum, Bombus ruderarius and Bombus sylvarum
- the European wool carder bee Anthidium manicatum, and
  - other members of the family Megachilidae which collect plant or animal hairs and fibers
