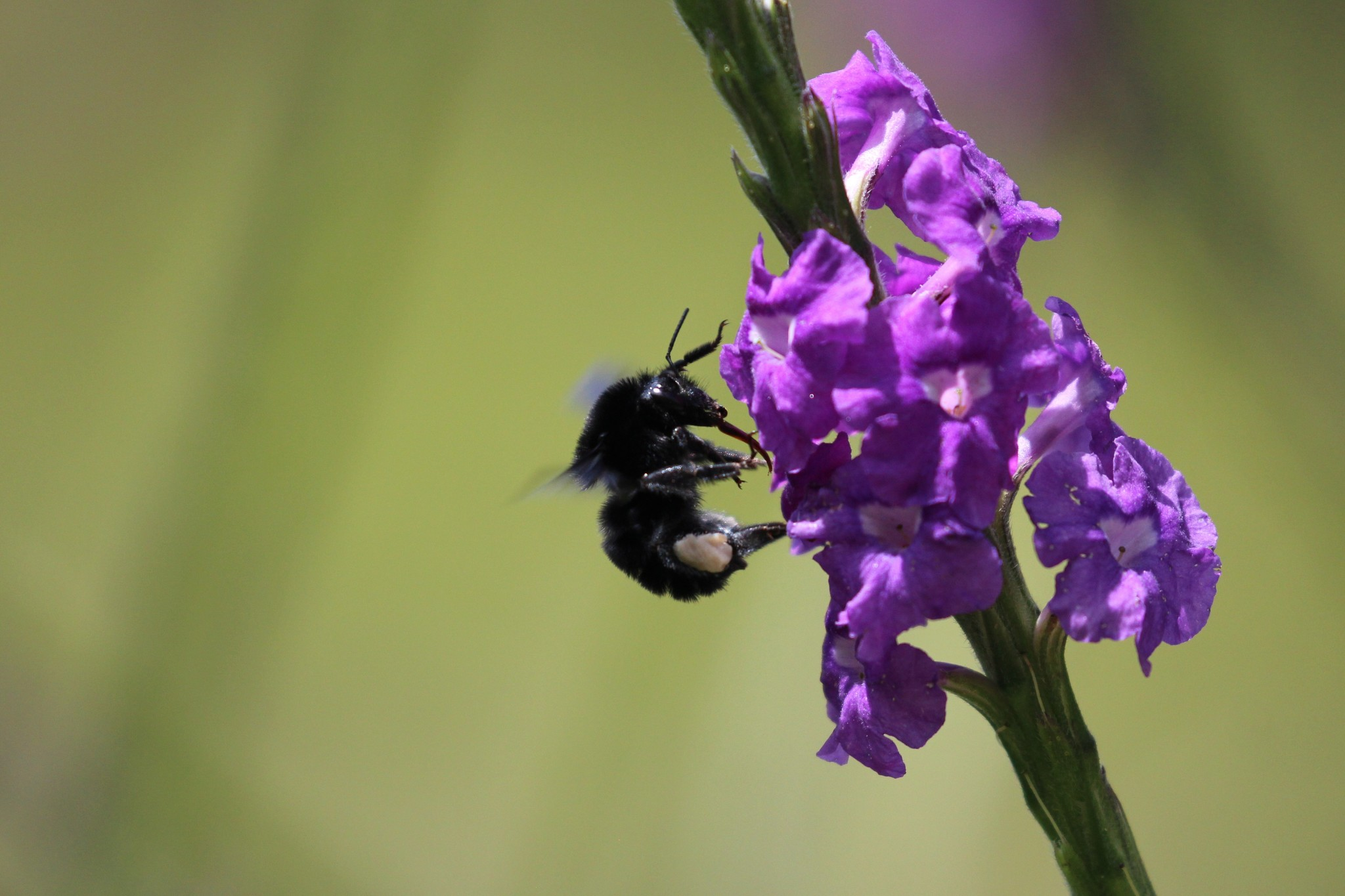
- Bombus pullatus foraging from a pink flower

Conservation status
- Data Deficient (IUCN 3.1)

Scientific classification
- Kingdom: Animalia
- Phylum: Arthropoda
- Clade: Pancrustacea
- Class: Insecta
- Order: Hymenoptera
- Family: Apidae
- Genus: Bombus
- Subgenus: Thoracobombus
- Species: B. pullatus

Binomial name
- Bombus pullatus Franklin, 1913

= Bombus pullatus =

Species of bee

Bombus pullatus is a tropical, eusocial species of bumblebee native to Mexico and Central America. Unlike many bumblebee species, they live in colonies with multiple queens.

== Distribution & Taxonomy ==
The majority of this species occurs in the lowlands of Central America, with approximately 90% of colonies being found in Costa Rica. However they have been found at elevations higher than 3 km above sea level. Colonies have been confirmed in Guatemala, Honduras, Nicaragua, Panama and the south of Mexico. Bombus pullatus is considered a more basal member of the genus Bombus compared to Bombus pauloensis and Bombus transversalis. Historically, Bombus pullatus has commonly been misidentified as Bombus pauloensis and vice versa in many collections. Molecular analyses (such as DNA profiling) of these specimens are required to accurately identify both species. This issue is why the IUCN has agreed to reject data on this species that is more southern than Panama.

== Behaviour ==
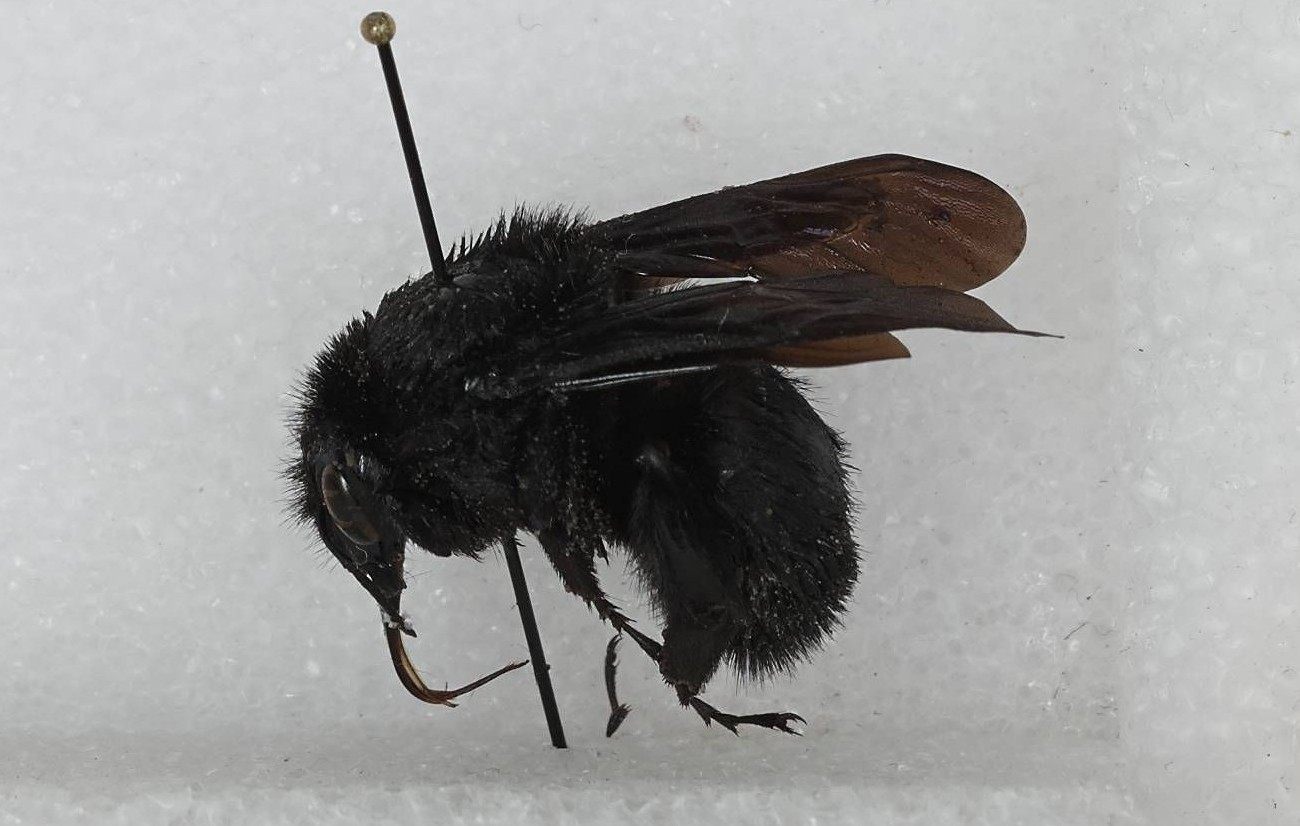
Preserved Bombus pullatus from the Smithsonian Institution

This species is known to be quite aggressive, stinging humans within approximately 6 m of the nest if it is disturbed.

Unlike most bumblebees, Bombus pullatus colonies contain multiple queens (a form of polygyny) like their close relative Bombus pauloensis (who rotate between polygyny and monogyny). However Bombus pullatus colonies have a comparatively higher number of queens. In one nest a total of 36 queens were sampled in a colony with a total of 343 individuals. Workers of this species are significantly smaller than males. This bee forages on many kinds of plants, including Miconia sp., Monochaetum sp., Solanum sp. Mimosa sp., and Spermacoce sp. Individual worker bees have displayed preferences for particular plant species. Foraging rate was calculated in one study to be 2.6-9.5 bees per minute. Pollen collectors had the highest activity in the early morning, however nectar collectors had a relatively constant rate during the day. Foraging trips lasted approximately 50 minutes.

=== Nesting ===
Their nests are mostly found on the ground, anchored to sturdy plants. This is thought to protect them from tropical storms. Much like their close relative Bombus pauloensis, their colonies display a degree of perenniality. One old nest was observed to contain both the bee colony and a colony of the leafcutter ant Acromyrmex octospinosus, which was occupying cells along the edge that had been abandoned by the bee. This bee can be rare in parts of its range with wet tropical climates because it is difficult to find a suitable dry nesting site and maintain it in such moist conditions. Their colonies are thought to consist of approximately 300 workers, however this is based on only counts from two individual nests. One nest was discovered 5.5 m above the ground, indicating that this species is not purely ground-nesting. This nest also appeared to be the second nest site of this colony as old worker cells were absent in it. This indicated that the colony was not sedentary unlike bumblebees in temperate regions. Workers "groom" the nest by moving leaves that they have shredded into the nest, then pulling or kicking it onto the sides to fortify it.
