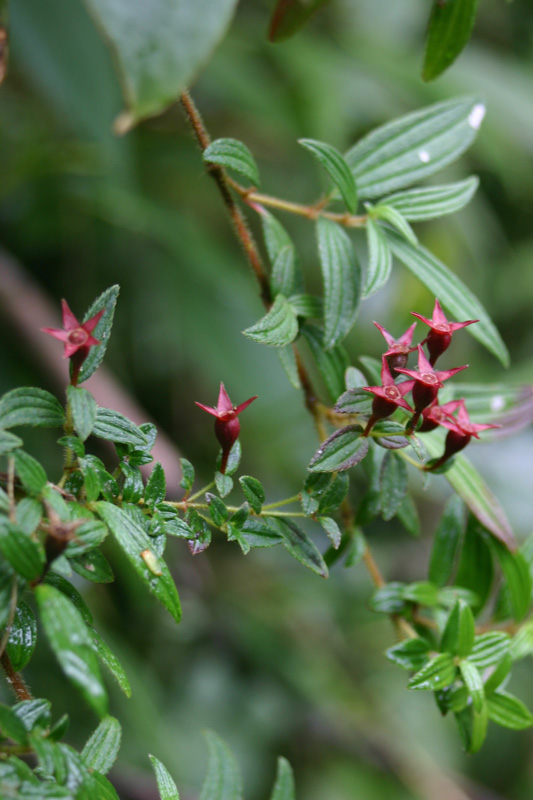
- Monochaetum floribundum fruits in Monteverde, Costa Rica

Scientific classification
- Kingdom: Plantae
- Clade: Tracheophytes
- Clade: Angiosperms
- Clade: Eudicots
- Clade: Rosids
- Order: Myrtales
- Family: Melastomataceae
- Genus: Monochaetum
- Species: M. floribundum

Binomial name
- Monochaetum floribundum (Schltdl.) Naudin

= Monochaetum floribundum =

Species of shrub

Monochaetum floribundum is a sprawling shrub native to Central America. It is commonly found in cloud forests. It is sometimes grown in gardens for its profuse, small pink flowers.
