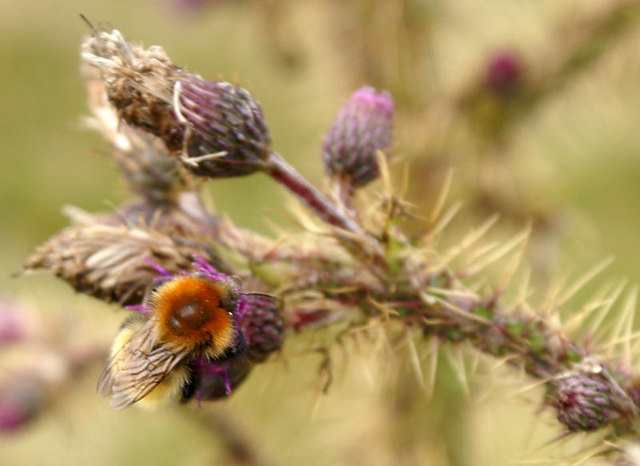
- Bombus muscorum agricolae – the Shetland subspecies

Scientific classification
- Kingdom: Animalia
- Phylum: Arthropoda
- Clade: Pancrustacea
- Class: Insecta
- Order: Hymenoptera
- Family: Apidae
- Genus: Bombus
- Subgenus: Thoracobombus
- Species: B. muscorum

Binomial name
- Bombus muscorum (Linnaeus, 1758)

Synonyms
- Apis muscorum Linnaeus, 1758

= Bombus muscorum =

Species of bee

Bombus muscorum, commonly known as the large carder bee or moss carder bee, is a species of bumblebee in the family Apidae. The species is found throughout Eurasia in fragmented populations, but is most commonly found in the British Isles. B. muscorum is a eusocial insect. The queen is monandrous, mating with only one male after leaving a mature nest to found its own. Males mate territorially and the species is susceptible to inbreeding and bottlenecks. The species builds its nests on or just under the ground in open grassland and forages very close to the nest. In recent years, populations have significantly declined due to loss of natural habitat. B. muscorum is currently listed as vulnerable in Europe by the European Red List of Bees.

== Taxonomy ==
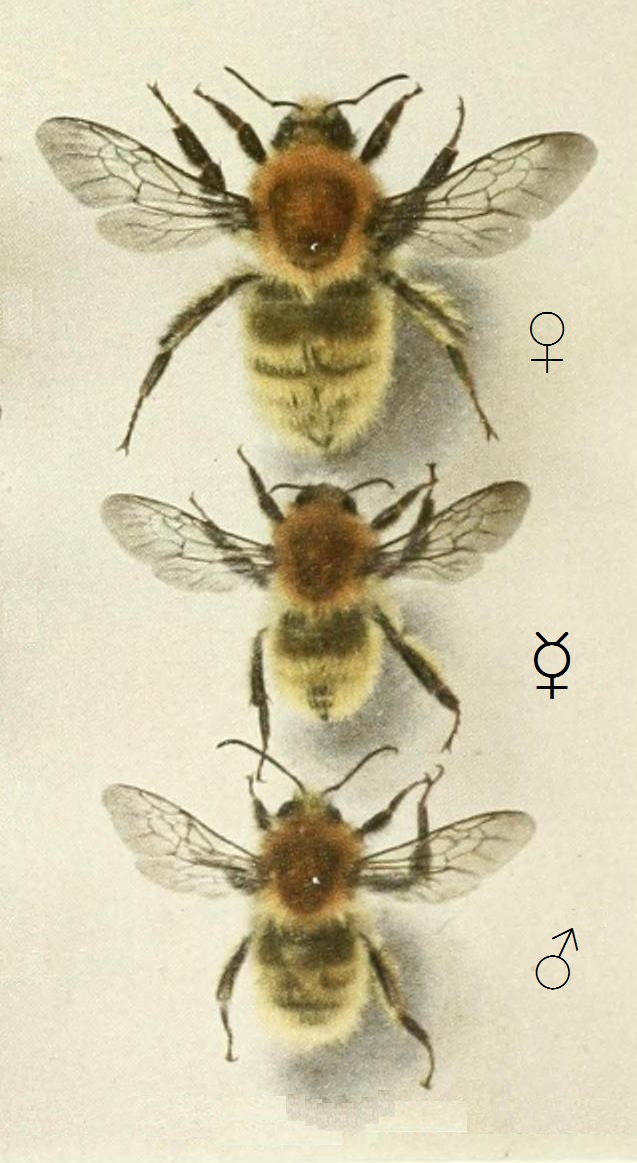
From top to bottom: A Bombus muscorum Queen, Worker, and Male.

B. muscorum was one of the many insect species originally described in 1758 by Carl Linnaeus in the 10th edition of Systema Naturae. It was given the binomial name Apis muscorum. The species name muscorum is the genitive plural of the Latin mūscus, meaning moss.

B. muscorum is part of the order Hymenoptera, the third largest order of insects, which includes bees, wasps, ants, and sawflies. It is part of the subfamily Apinae, which contains the majority of species within the family Apidae. It is part of the tribe Bombini, which contains a single living genus Bombus, consisting entirely of bumblebees. Within Bombus, B. muscorum is part of the subgenus Thoracobombus, which includes closely relates species such Bombus pauloensis, Bombus dahlbomii, Bombus fervidus, Bombus morio, Bombus pensylvanicus, and Bombus transversalis. The species is further differentiated into at least seven different subspecies. These include B. muscorum sladeni and B. muscorum smithianu, found in the United Kingdom and differentiated on the basis of coat color. Certain forms of this variable taxon are considered separate species by some authors, including B. bannitus and B. pereziellus.

== Description ==
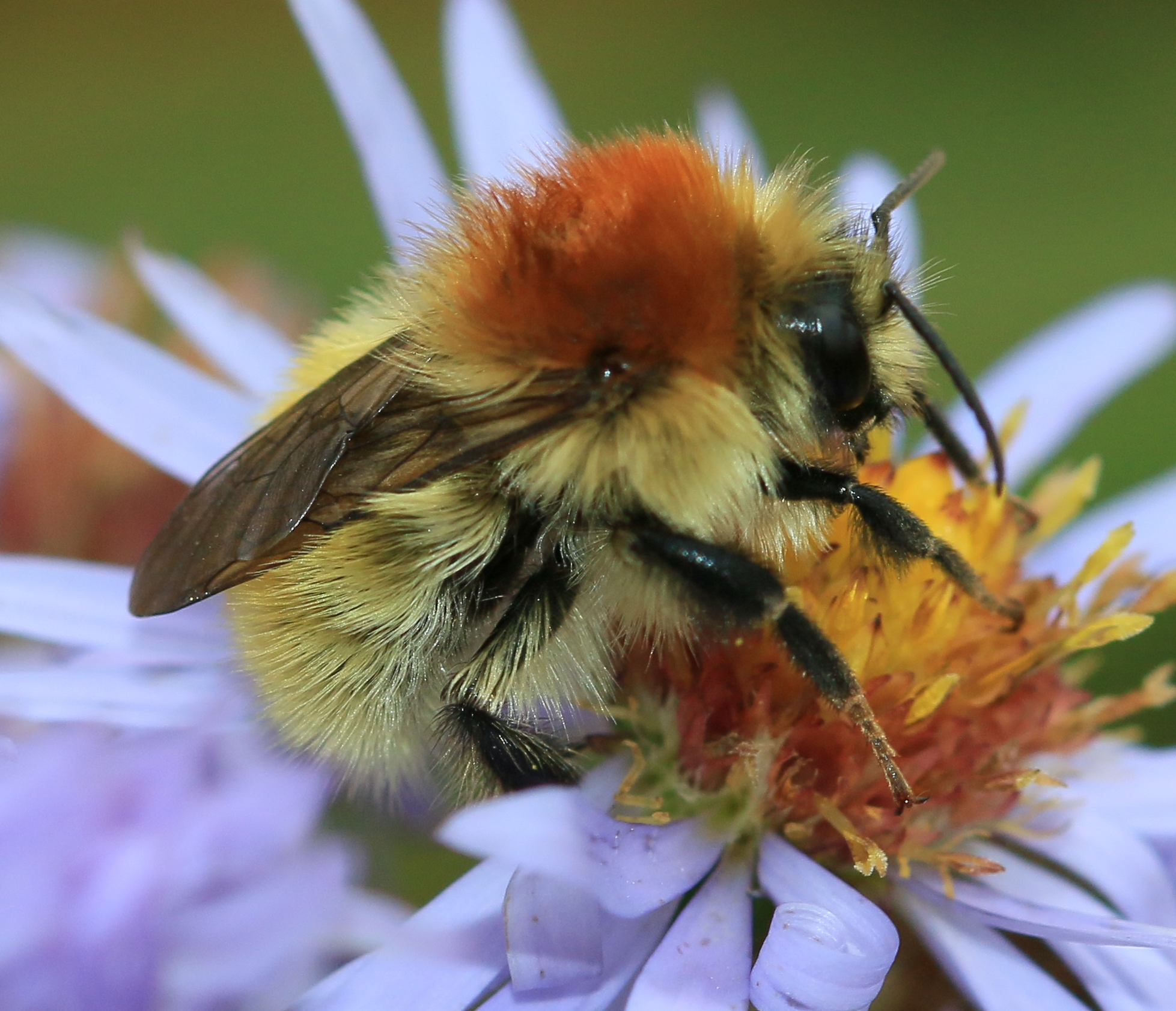
A male moss carder bee in Deepsyke Forest, Peeblesshire, Scotland on an Aster flower.

B. muscorum is characterized by its oblong face and long tongue. The bristles of the species are ginger in color and cover the head, thorax, and abdomen. The abdomen, however, can have a darker, brownish coloring. In some subspecies, black bristles are intermixed with the ginger bristles that characterize the species. Some subspecies have an entirely black ventral side. The species is similar in appearance to the more common Bombus pascuorum. The queen has a body length 17–19 mm and a wingspan of 32–35 mm. Workers have a body length of 10–16 mm and a wingspan of 26–29 mm. Males have a body length of 13–15 mm and a wingspan of 26–29 mm.

== Distribution and habitat ==
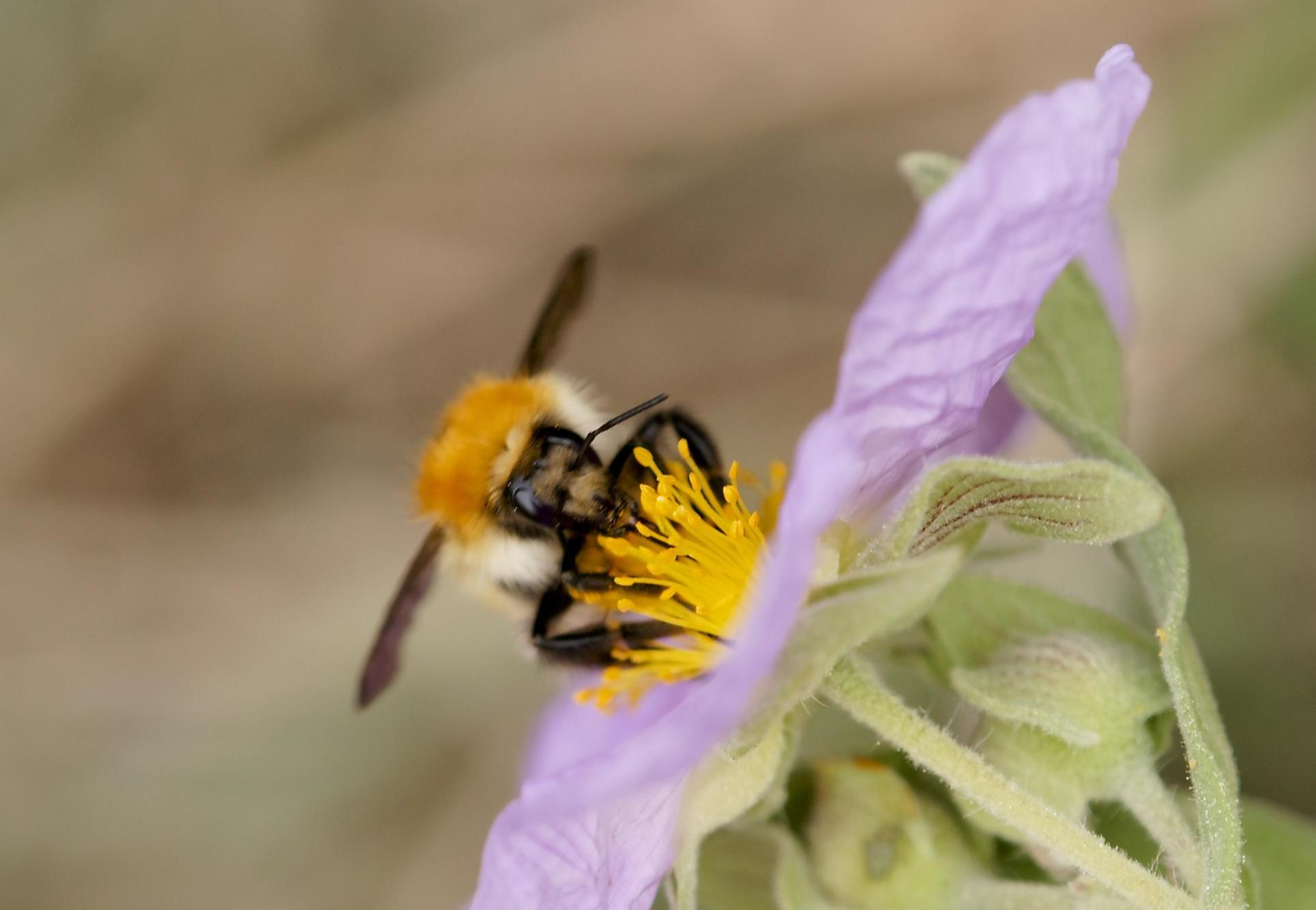
Bombus muscorum in Gavà, Catalonia, Spain foraging on Cistus albidus.

B. muscorum is widely distributed throughout Eurasia. Populations appear from Ireland in the West to Mongolia in the East. The species has been observed as far north as Scandinavia and Russia and has been spotted as far south as Crete. Populations, however, are fairly rare in all locations. Populations in the United Kingdom have declined sharply since the 1970s. Once widely distributed throughout the British Isles, distributions are now fragmented and predominantly coastal. Populations of other species, such as Bombus pascuorum, appear to be replacing B. muscorum in some parts of Northern Britain. The species is still relatively abundant in Northern Scotland. B. muscorum is classified as vulnerable in Europe by the IUCN.

B. muscorum inhabits moors, grasslands, and salt marshes, where it builds its nest above ground. In the British Isles, B. muscorum nests in open landscapes near coastal areas in the lowlands. Populations are found in moorland and machair in the North. In the South, populations are found in coastal marshes, shingle, and calcareous grasslands. Nests have been found near open regions of fallowed land and man-made ditches. Colonies are small, numbering between 20 and 100 workers.

== Diet ==
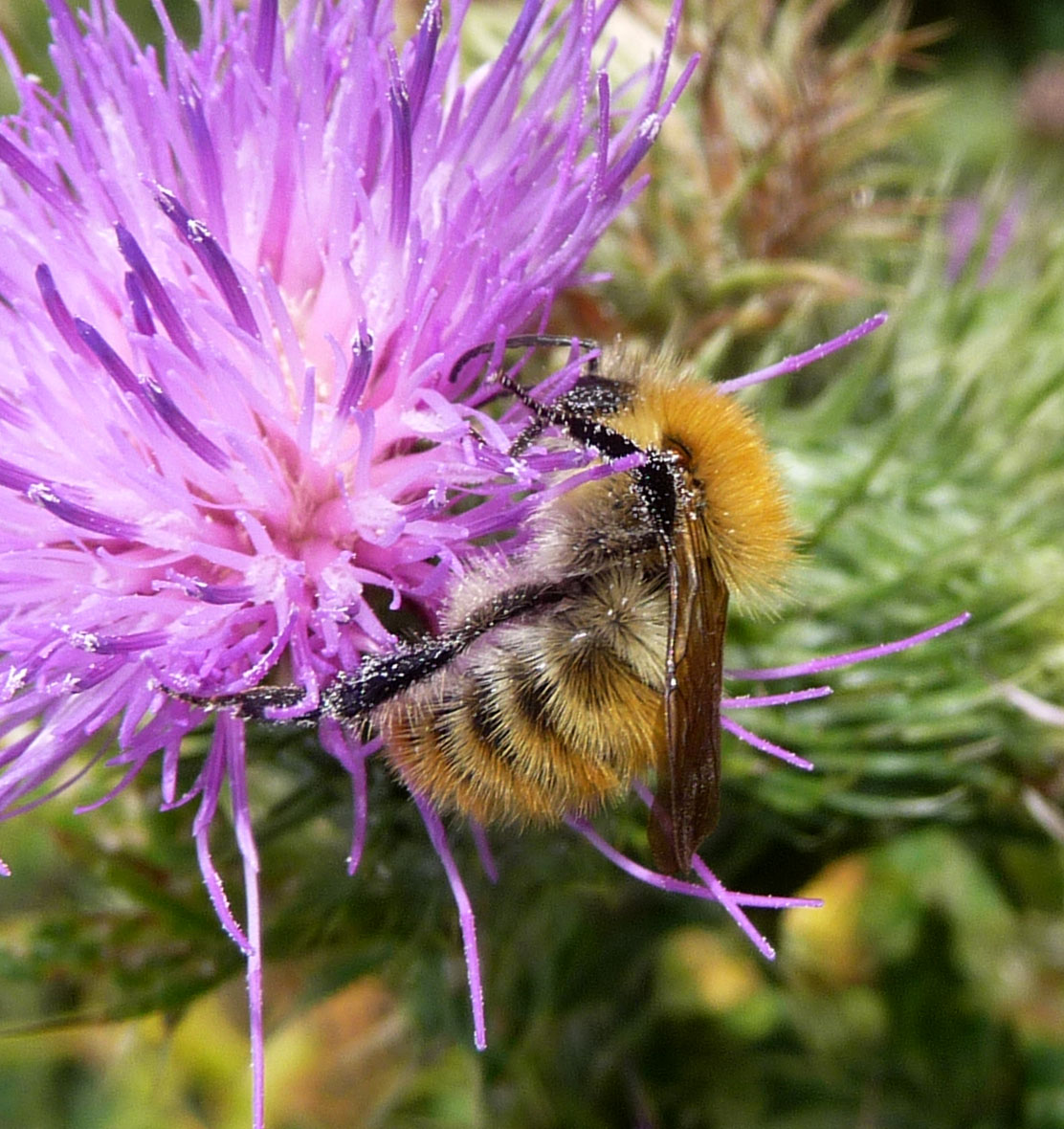
An adult moss carder bee on thistle, covered in pollen

B. muscorum is polylectic, the diet of the species depends on the surrounding area. The species has a strong preference for flowers of the families Fabaceae, Scrophulariaceae, Lamiaceae, and Asteraceae. Common food sources include clover, bird's-foot trefoil, vetches, and thistles. Flowers with long corollas are especially dependent on the long-tongued species.

== Colony cycle ==
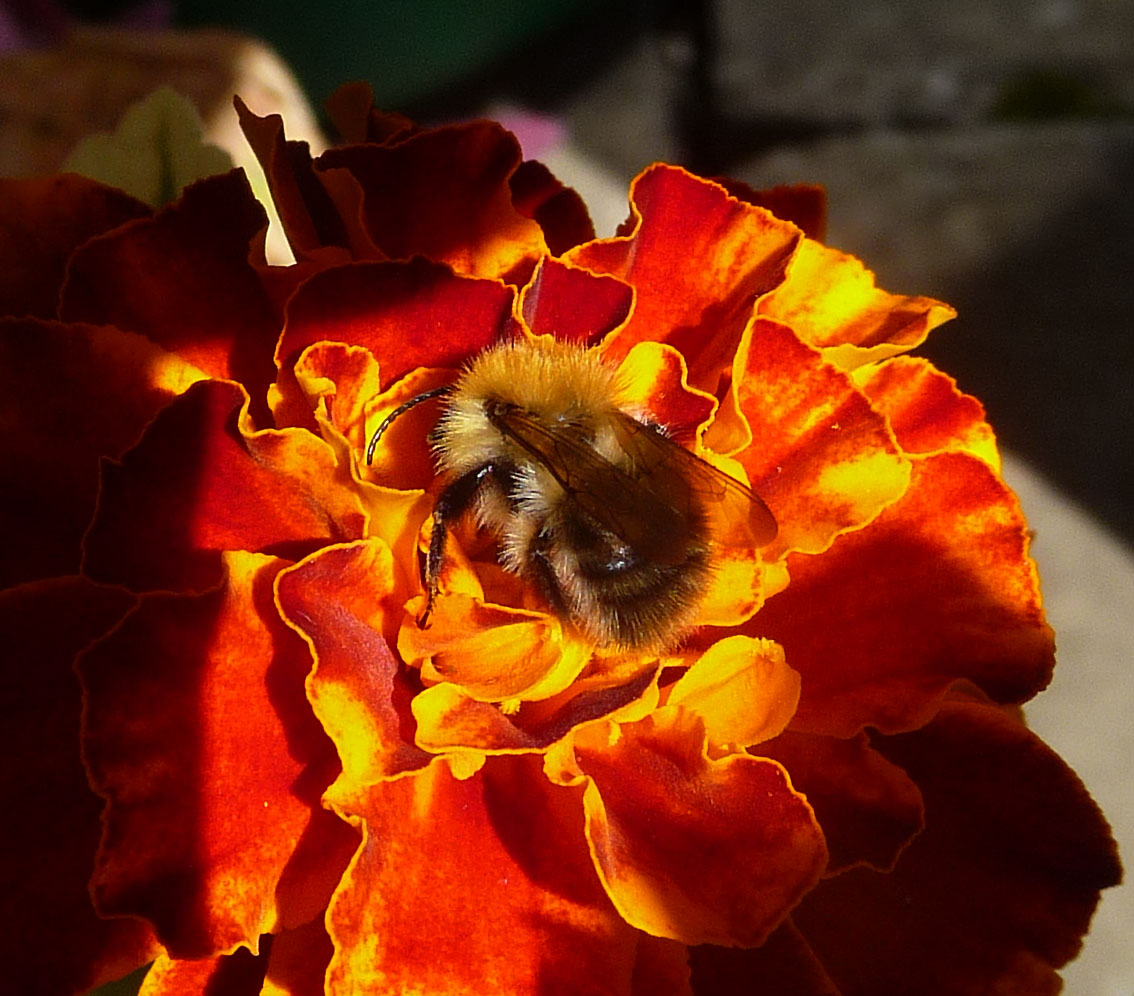
A moss carder bee on the flower of the French marigold in Cradley, Herefordshire, England.

A number of new queens are produced in the last brood of the summer colony. These queens mate and then hibernate for an average of 9 months. From March to May, these queens emerge from hibernation to search for nesting sites. After a suitable site is found, the queen lays a small batch of diploid eggs. Once these eggs hatch, the queen tends to the larvae until they are grown and pupate. These pupa emerge as workers. From June onward, the queen will produce a steady supply of workers. From July to September, new males and queens are present and mate.

== Reproduction ==
=== Haplodiploidy ===
B. muscorum, like many bees, exhibit haplodiploidy. The diploid queens produce diploid workers and new queens from fertilized eggs. Haploid males are produced from unfertilized eggs. Workers are also able to lay unfertilized eggs that develop into males. Haploid males produce identical haploid sperm while diploid females produce genetically variant haploid eggs through meiosis. Sex is determined under a single-locus complementary sex determination (sl-CSD) system, where multiple alleles at a single locus determine the sex of an individual. Sex locus heterozygotes develop as females, while hemizygous and homozygous eggs develop as haploid and diploid males.

=== Mating system ===
B. muscorum is thought to be a monandrous species; the queen mates only once with a single male to start a new colony. This monandrous behavior decreases the amount of genetic variation present in a single colony relative to that of a polygynous or polyandrous species. As a result, B. muscorum has an increased susceptibility to the effects of inbreeding. Queens may possess a distinctive odor that signals relatedness and prevents interbreeding. Studies have shown, however, that mating appears to be random.

=== Nest surveillance ===
Male mating strategies of bumblebees can be grouped into four broad categories: patrolling, racing, territorial, and cruising. Males of B. muscorum exhibit territorial strategies for mating. In this strategy, males choose a perch outside of a mature nest and pursue potential mates that it spots. Males compete with one another for preferred perches, each attempting to find a spot close to the nest entrance. When another bee flies too close to a perched male, the male sets off in pursuit for several seconds, seeking to either chase away a potential competitor or mount a potential mate. After the chase, one of the males will land back at the perch close to the nest.

=== Inbreeding ===
As a result of small population sizes and haplodiploidy, B. muscorum has an increased susceptibility to inbreeding. As sex is determined at a single locus, the overall fitness of a population is directly related to the number of different alleles at the sex locus, which in turn is related to the size and isolation of the population. When males mate with related queens, diploid males with reduced fertility and immune response are produced. 10 out of 14 B. muscorum populations in the Hebrides showed significant signs of recent bottlenecking. In recent years, diploid males have come to represent a considerable proportion of males within populations in the British Isles, suggesting an increase in inbreeding among populations.

== Behavior ==
=== Foraging ===
B. muscorum exhibit small foraging ranges, having been recorded going no further than 500 m from their nest to forage. Foraging, however, often takes place within 100 m of the nest. Individuals are often observed foraging at the same spots between 50 and 200 m away from the nest. This variation in individual flight range is attributed to an individual's body size. B. muscorum has been described as doorstep foragers, due to the tendency of workers to use food resources near the nest more frequently than the workers of other species. This restricted radius may be an important factor in the decline of the species.

=== Nesting ===
B. muscorum build its nest on or just under the ground. It cards together collected moss and dry grass to cover the nest. It is this behavior that gives B. muscorum the name moss carder bee. It rarely, if ever, crosses sea barriers greater than 10 km to establish a nesting site. Once a nest is established, the bee is notoriously aggressive, readily attacking intruders that are too close to the nest, which they bite and sting simultaneously.

== Parasitism ==
=== Crithidia bombi ===
B. muscorum may contract infections of Crithidia bombi, a trypanosome parasite, from infected nest mates or from others while foraging on contaminated flowers. Infections have been linked to reduced individual and colony fitness, but the specific relationship between Crithidia bombi and B. muscorum is complex. The presence of Crithidia bombi has been found to be higher in populations with lower genetic diversity. As B. muscorum populations continue to lose heterozygosity, the impact of parasitism increases, pushing already threatened populations closer to extinction.

== Human impact ==
=== Habitat destruction ===
Due to recent decades of agricultural intensification in Europe, the natural habitat of B. muscorum has been largely diminished. Many of the permanent flower-rich areas where the bee commonly forages have been destroyed by increased commercial farming. B. muscorum has poor dispersal ability compared to other species of bumblebee, making it more vulnerable to habitat loss. As a result, populations have decreased dramatically in recent decades.

=== Status ===
B. muscorum is currently listed as vulnerable in Europe by the IUCN. Populations are diminishing in Britain and the species is currently in a species recovery program. Decreasing populations are evident in multiple European countries. Estonia lists the species as vulnerable. Germany and the Netherlands consider the species to be endangered.

=== Sea walls ===
B. muscorum is often found on sea wall flood defenses managed by the Environment Agency. Nests can be found on the flat grassy area between the sea and the borrowdyke, a brackish pond behind the sea wall. As grasslands on sea walls are predominantly unimproved, they have become an important habitat for rare insect species such as B. muscorum. Current research is examining how these sea walls can be maintained to preserve rare populations.
