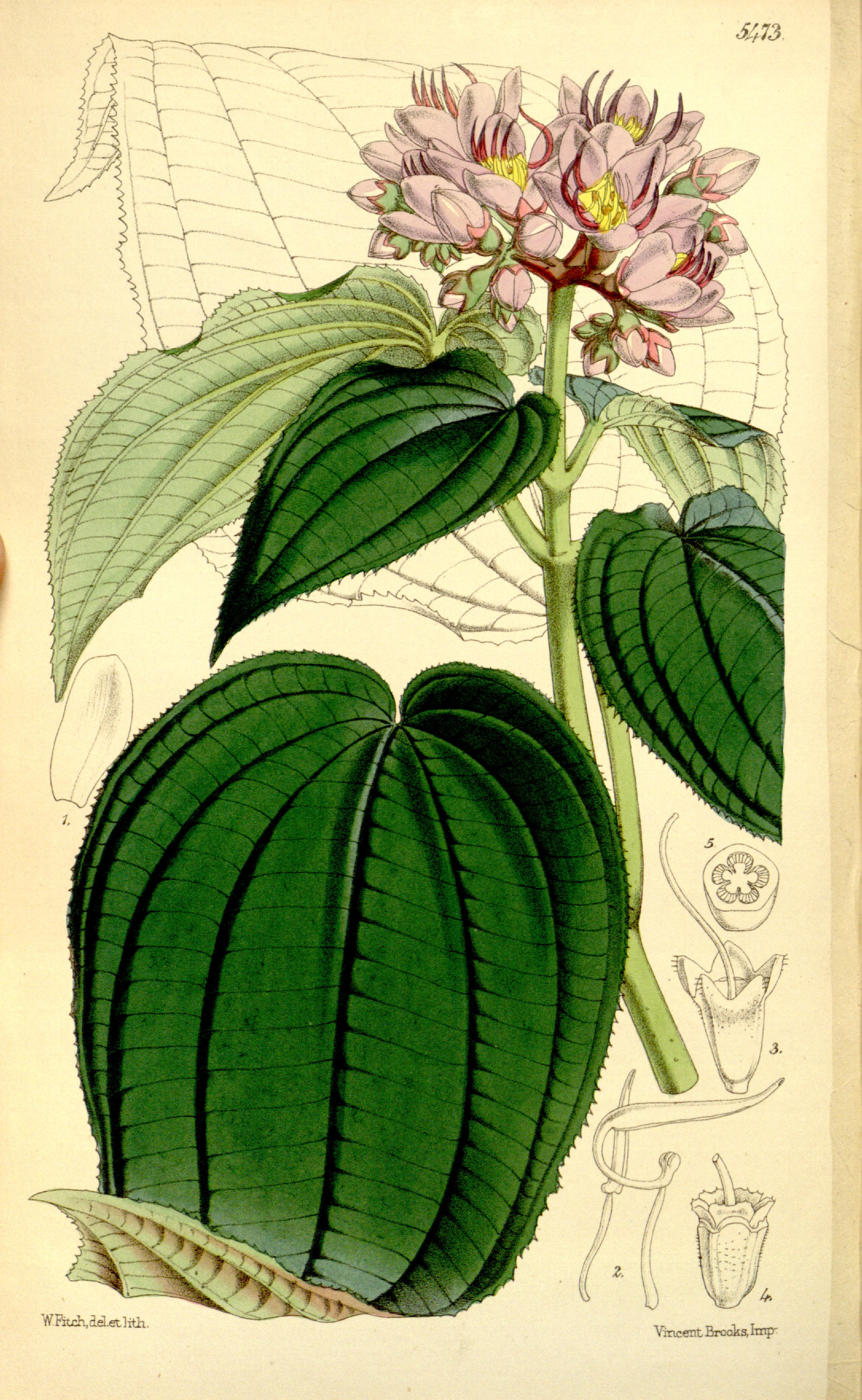
- Amphiblemma cymosum

Scientific classification
- Kingdom: Plantae
- Clade: Tracheophytes
- Clade: Angiosperms
- Clade: Eudicots
- Clade: Rosids
- Order: Myrtales
- Family: Melastomataceae
- Genus: Amphiblemma; Naudin

= Amphiblemma =

Genus of flowering plants

Amphiblemma is a genus of flowering plants in the family Melastomataceae. It includes 14 species native to the evergreen forests of west and central tropical Africa.

== Species ==
14 species are accepted.

- Amphiblemma amoenum Jacq.-Fél.
- Amphiblemma ciliatum Cogn.
- Amphiblemma cuneatum Jacq.-Fél.
- Amphiblemma cymosum Naudin
- Amphiblemma gossweileri Exell
- Amphiblemma hallei Jacq.-Fél.
- Amphiblemma heterophyllum Jacq.-Fél.
- Amphiblemma lanceatum Jacq.-Fél.
- Amphiblemma letouzeyi Jacq.-Fél.
- Amphiblemma mildbraedii Gilg ex Engl.
- Amphiblemma monticola Jacq.-Fél.
- Amphiblemma mvensis M.E.Leal
- Amphiblemma setosum Hook.f.
- Amphiblemma soyauxii Cogn.

=== Formerly placed here ===
- Mendelia mollis (Hook.f.) Ver.-Lib. & G.Kadereit (as Amphiblemma molle Hook.f., A. erythropodum Gilg & Ledermann ex Engl., and A. riparium Gilg)
