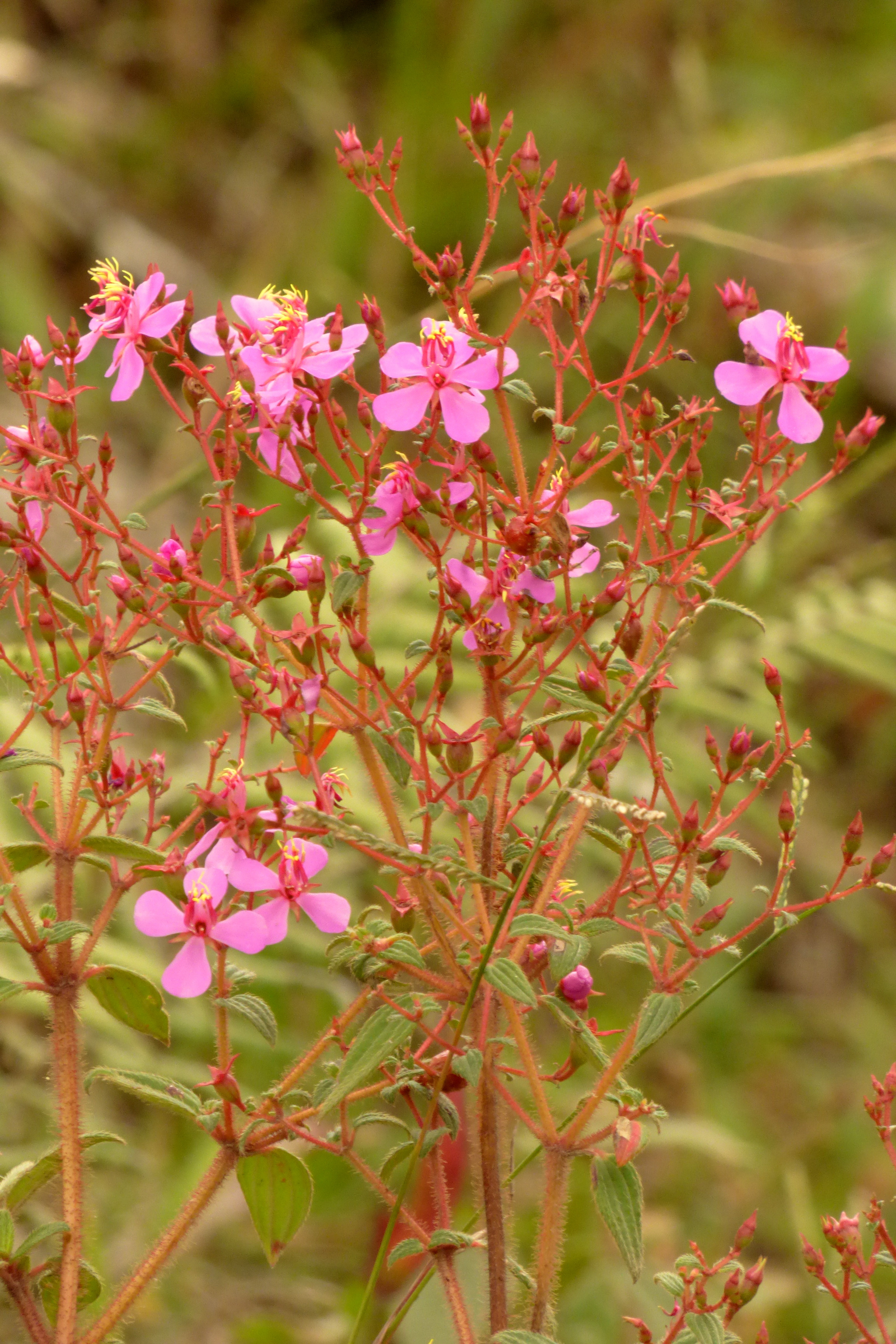

Scientific classification
- Kingdom: Plantae
- Clade: Tracheophytes
- Clade: Angiosperms
- Clade: Eudicots
- Clade: Rosids
- Order: Myrtales
- Family: Melastomataceae
- Genus: Monochaetum
- Species: M. multiflorum

Binomial name
- Monochaetum multiflorum (Bonpl.) Naudin Ann. Sci. Nat., Bot. sér. 3, 4: 52. 1845

= Monochaetum multiflorum =

Species of flowering plant

Monochaetum multiflorum is a flowering plant species in the genus Monochaetum indigenous to Colombia.

The leaves of the plant contain the hydrolysable tannins nobotanins Q, R, S, and T. It also contains the tetrameric nobotanin S and pentameric melastoflorin A.
