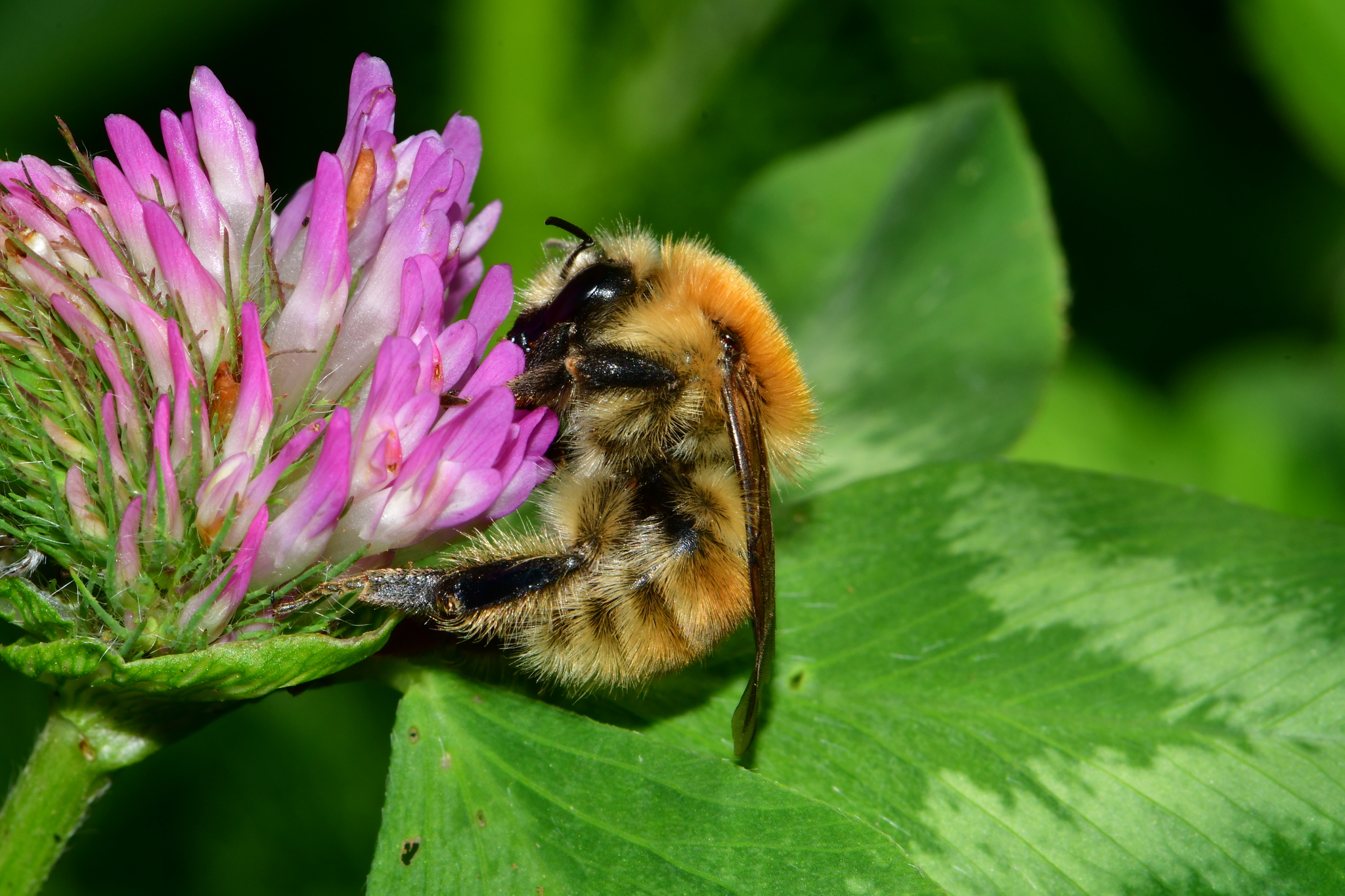
- Yartsevsky District, Smolensk Oblast, 2022

Conservation status
- Least Concern (IUCN 3.1)

Scientific classification
- Kingdom: Animalia
- Phylum: Arthropoda
- Class: Insecta
- Order: Hymenoptera
- Family: Apidae
- Genus: Bombus
- Subgenus: Thoracobombus
- Species: B. humilis

Binomial name
- Bombus humilis Illiger, 1806

Synonyms
- Megabombus humilis

= Brown-banded carder bee =

Species of bee

The brown-banded carder bee (Bombus humilis) is a bumblebee found in most of Europe west of Russia, with the exception of Ireland and Iceland. It is also found in Turkey, on the Tibetan plateau, northern China, eastern and southern Mongolia, and parts of North Korea. In Britain, it is limited to the coast and chalkland areas of southern England, though the species has also been found in the Queen Elizabeth Olympic Park. The brown-banded carder bee is similar in appearance to the moss carder bee. As they share similar habitats, care must be taken to distinguish between the two.

== Description ==
The brown-banded carder bee is medium-sized with a relatively long tongue. The queen is 16–18 mm (0.63–0.71 in) long, the worker 10–15 mm (0.39–0.59 in).

The thorax is usually yellow-orange on top, with beige flanks, but may be dark brown. Most of the abdomen is beige, too, although with a somewhat striped effect. Both queens (the reproductive females) and workers usually have a broad, dark brown band (hence the common name) on the upper side of the abdomen, near the front, although it can be missing on some workers. A few black hairs - may only be one or two – are present on the thorax near the wing-bases. Males are similar to queens, but they lack stings and have longer antennae.

== Colony Cycle ==
Its flight period lasts from about May to September. The queen emerges from hibernation in the spring and makes a nest on the surface of the ground, preferable among grass tufts. The size of the nest is quite small, usually less than 100 inhabitants.

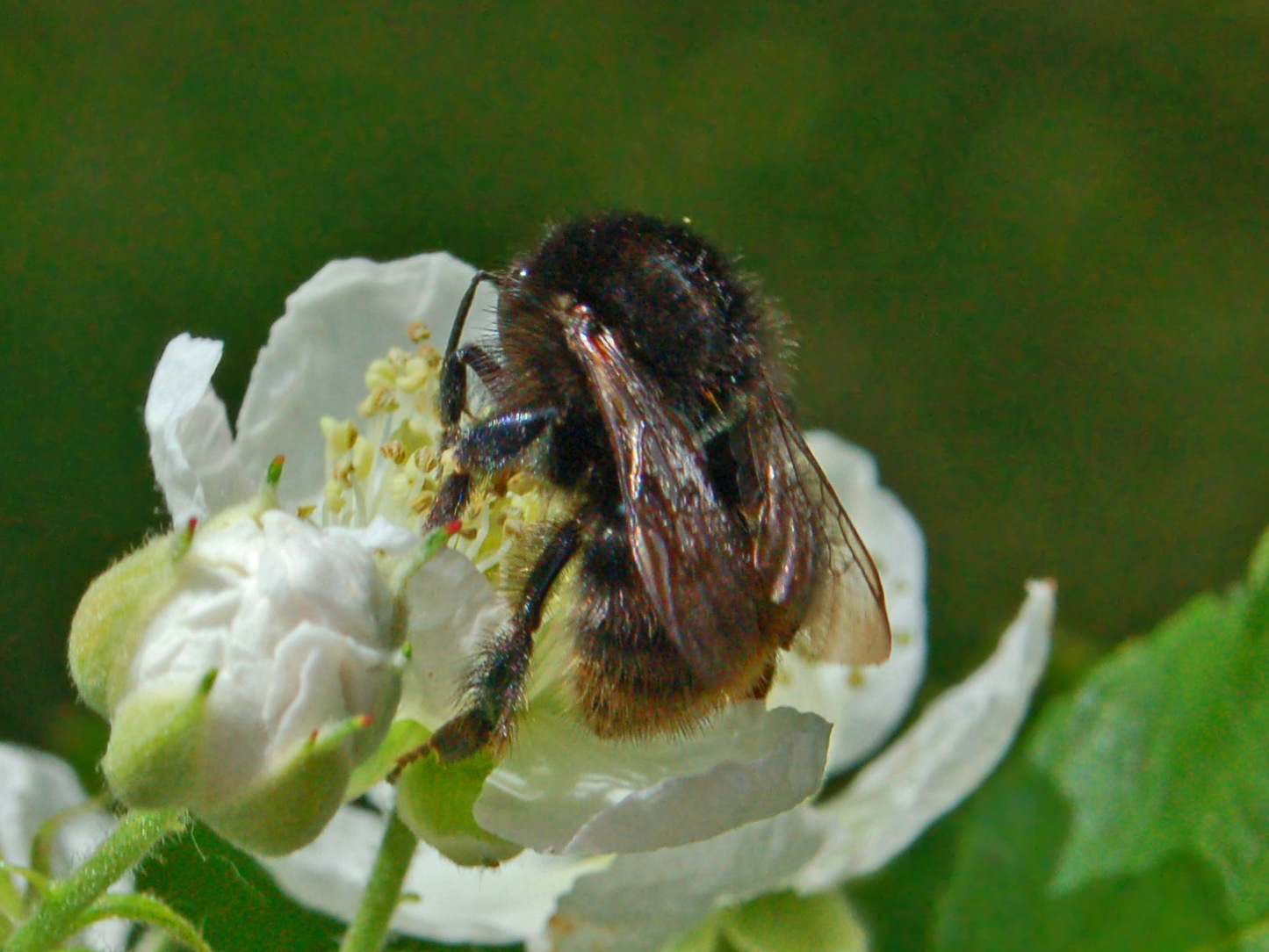
Bombus humilis ssp. appeninus

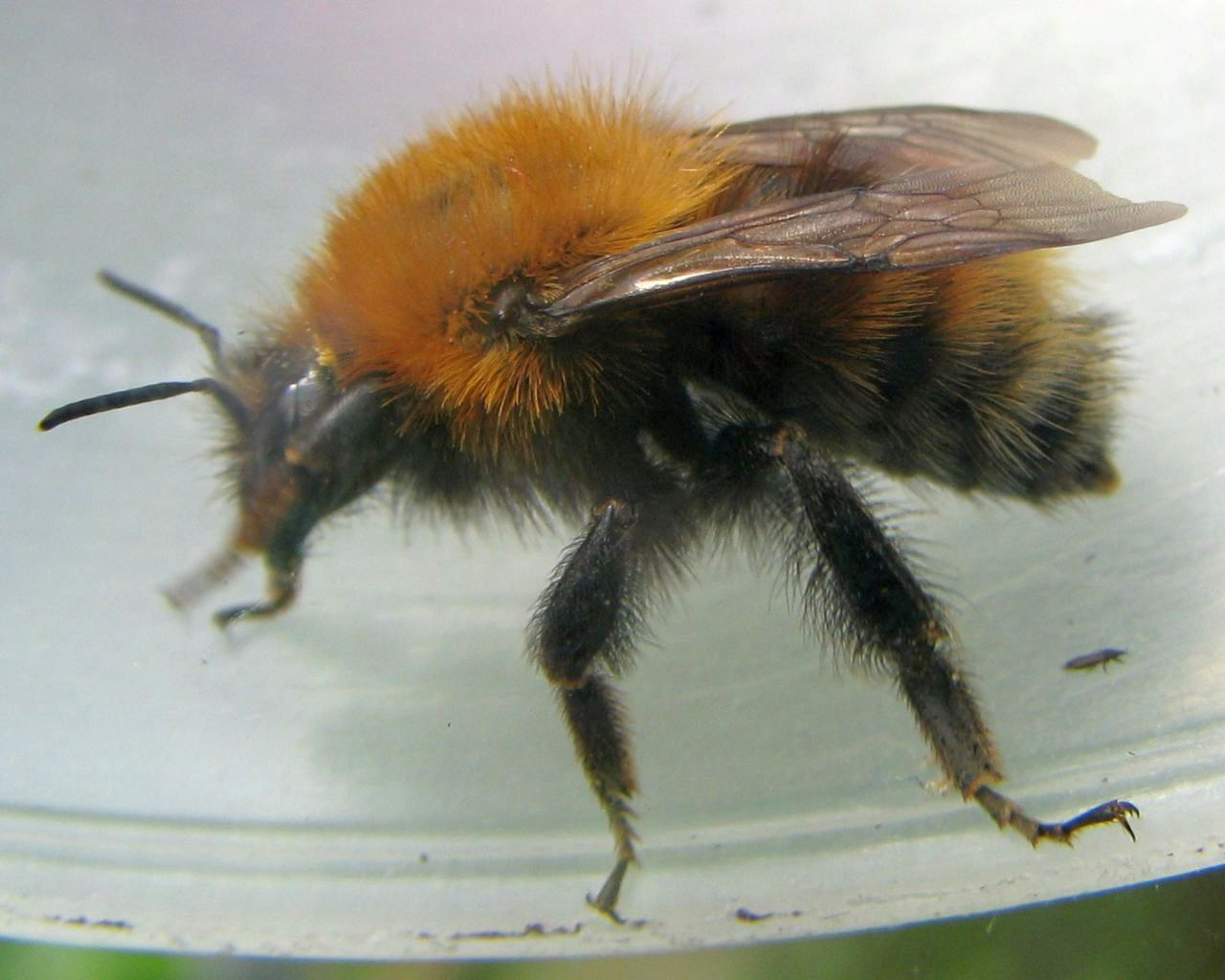

== Habitat ==
The brown-banded carder bee favours vast grasslands. In Central Asia, it is an alpine species, living at altitudes of 3,000–3,900 m (9,800–12,800 ft). Among the plants visited are Trifolium pratense (red clover), Centaurea (knapweed) and Vicia (vetches).

== Threats ==
The brown-banded carder bee is threatened by habitat loss due to intensive farming. As Goulson, Hanley, Darvill, Ellis, and Knight have pointed out, a contributing factor in the northern part of its distribution (including Britain) is that B. humilis, being near the edge of its latitudinal range, is not well adapted to local conditions, so is sensitive to habitat changes, especially loss of unimproved grassland meadows.
