= Amphiblemma amoenum =

Conservation status
- Vulnerable (IUCN 3.1)

Scientific classification
- Kingdom: Plantae
- Clade: Tracheophytes
- Clade: Angiosperms
- Clade: Eudicots
- Clade: Rosids
- Order: Myrtales
- Family: Melastomataceae
- Genus: Amphiblemma
- Species: A. amoenum

Binomial name
- Amphiblemma amoenum Jacques-Felix

Species of flowering plant

Amphiblemma amoenum is a species of plant in the family Melastomataceae. It is endemic to Cameroon. Its natural habitat is subtropical or tropical moist lowland forests. It is threatened by habitat loss.
