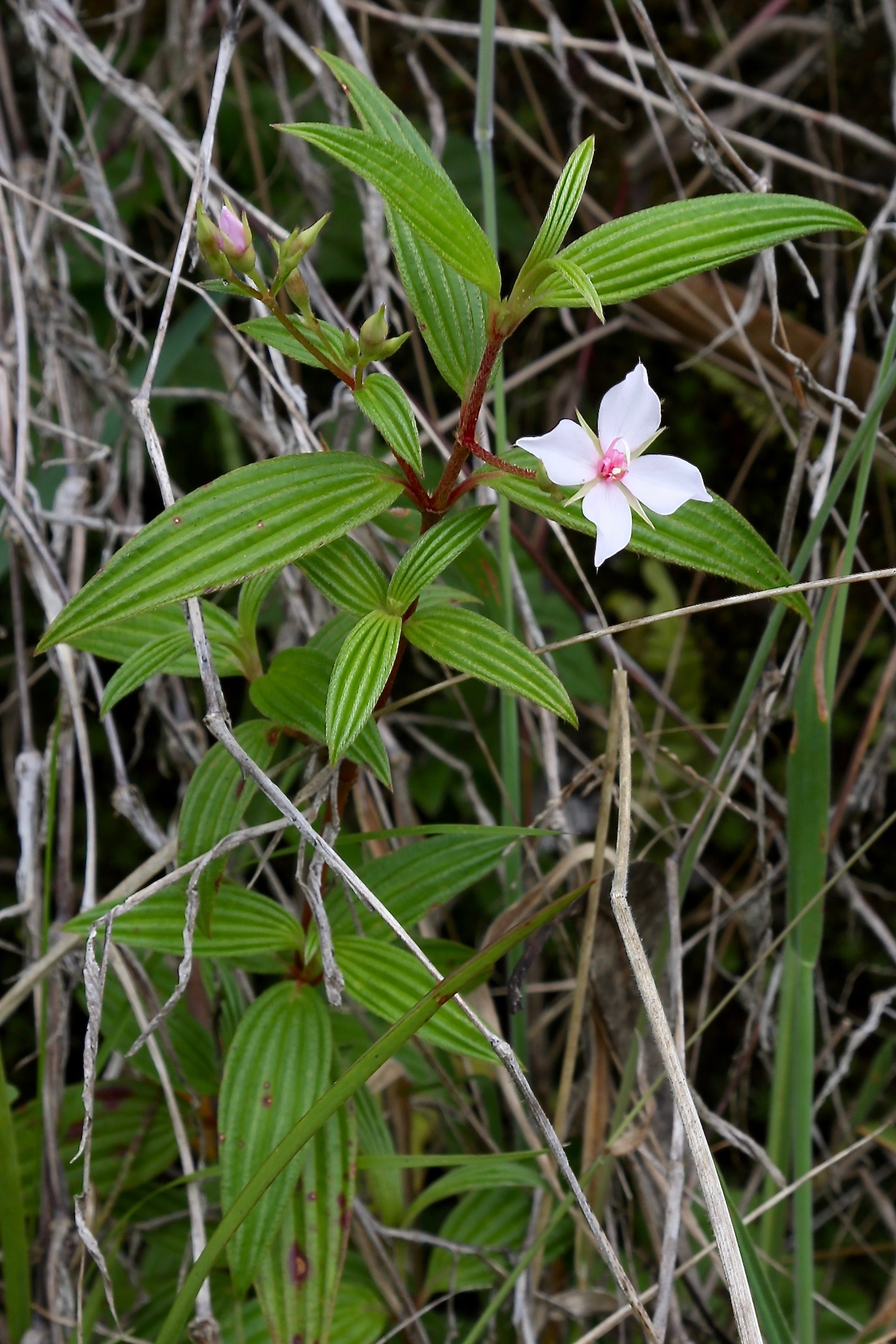
- Monochaetum lineatum
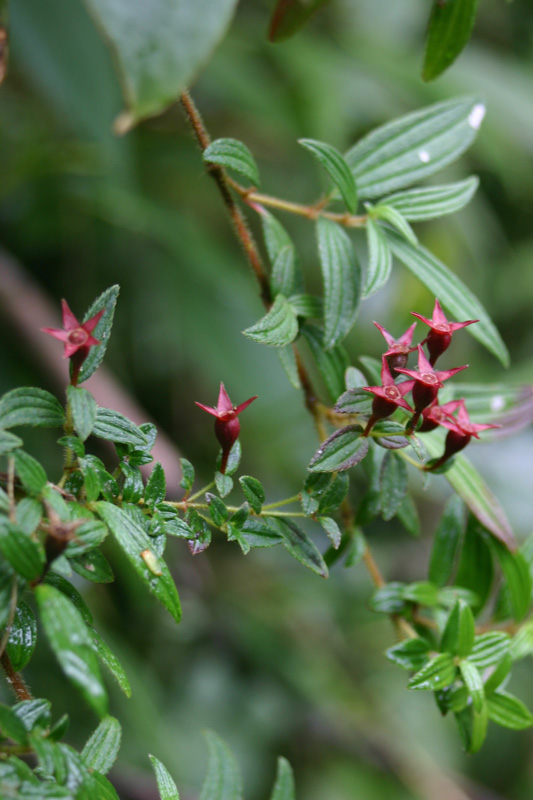
- Monochaetum floribundum

Scientific classification
- Kingdom: Plantae
- Clade: Tracheophytes
- Clade: Angiosperms
- Clade: Eudicots
- Clade: Rosids
- Order: Myrtales
- Family: Melastomataceae
- Genus: Monochaetum (DC.) Naudin

Species
- See text

Synonyms
- Ephynes Raf.; Grischowia H.Karst.; Loevigia H.Karst. & Triana; Roezlia Regel

= Monochaetum =

Genus of flowering plants

Monochaetum is a neotropical genus of shrubs and subshrubs with about 54 species. It occurs in warm temperate to tropical montane habitats from Mexico and Central America to the South American Andes of Colombia, Venezuela, Ecuador, and Peru with one species reaching the Guayana Highlands of Venezuela and Guyana.

Monochaetum is characterized by its tetramerous flowers, prevailingly dimorphic stamens with dorsally appendiculate anthers, capsular fruits that are free from the hypanthium, and cochleate seeds.

== Species ==
As of November 2024, Plants of the World Online (POWO) listed the following accepted species of Monochaetum.

- M. alpestre Naudin
- M. amabile Almeda
- M. amistadense Almeda
- M. bonplandii (Kunth) Naudin
- M. brachyurum Naudin
- M. calcaratum Triana
- M. carbonoi Alvear & Almeda
- M. ciliatum Gleason
- M. cinereum Gleason
- M. compactum Almeda
- M. cordatum Almeda
- M. deppeanum Naudin
- M. dicranantherum Naudin
- M. discolor H.Karst. ex Triana
- M. ecaudatum Gleason
- M. exaltatum Almeda
- M. expansum (Gleason) Alvear & Almeda
- M. floribundum Naudin
- M. glanduliferum Triana
- M. gleasonianum Wurdack
- M. hartwegianum Naudin
- M. humboldtianum (Kunth & C.D.Bouché) Walp.
- M. laxifolium Gleason
- M. lindenianum Naudin
- M. linearifolium Almeda
- M. lineatum Naudin
- M. longicaudatum Alvear & Almeda
- M. macrantherum Gleason
- M. magdalenense Wurdack
- M. mariae Wurdack
- M. meridense Naudin
- M. multiflorum (Bonpl.) Naudin
- M. myrtoideum (Bonpl.) Naudin
- M. neglectum Almeda
- M. perijense Alvear & Almeda
- M. polyneurum Triana
- M. pulchrum Decne.
- M. rodriguezii Wurdack
- M. rotundifolium Cogn. ex Gleason
- M. rubescens Gleason
- M. stellulatum Naudin
- M. strigosum Cogn.
- M. subditivum J.F.Macbr.
- M. subglabrum Gleason
- M. tachirense Wurdack
- M. talamancense Almeda
- M. tenellum Naudin
- M. tonaense Alvear & Almeda
- M. trichophyllum Almeda
- M. uberrimum Sandwith
- M. uribei Wurdack
- M. vestitum Almeda, Al.Rodr. & Garita
- M. vulcanicum Cogn.
