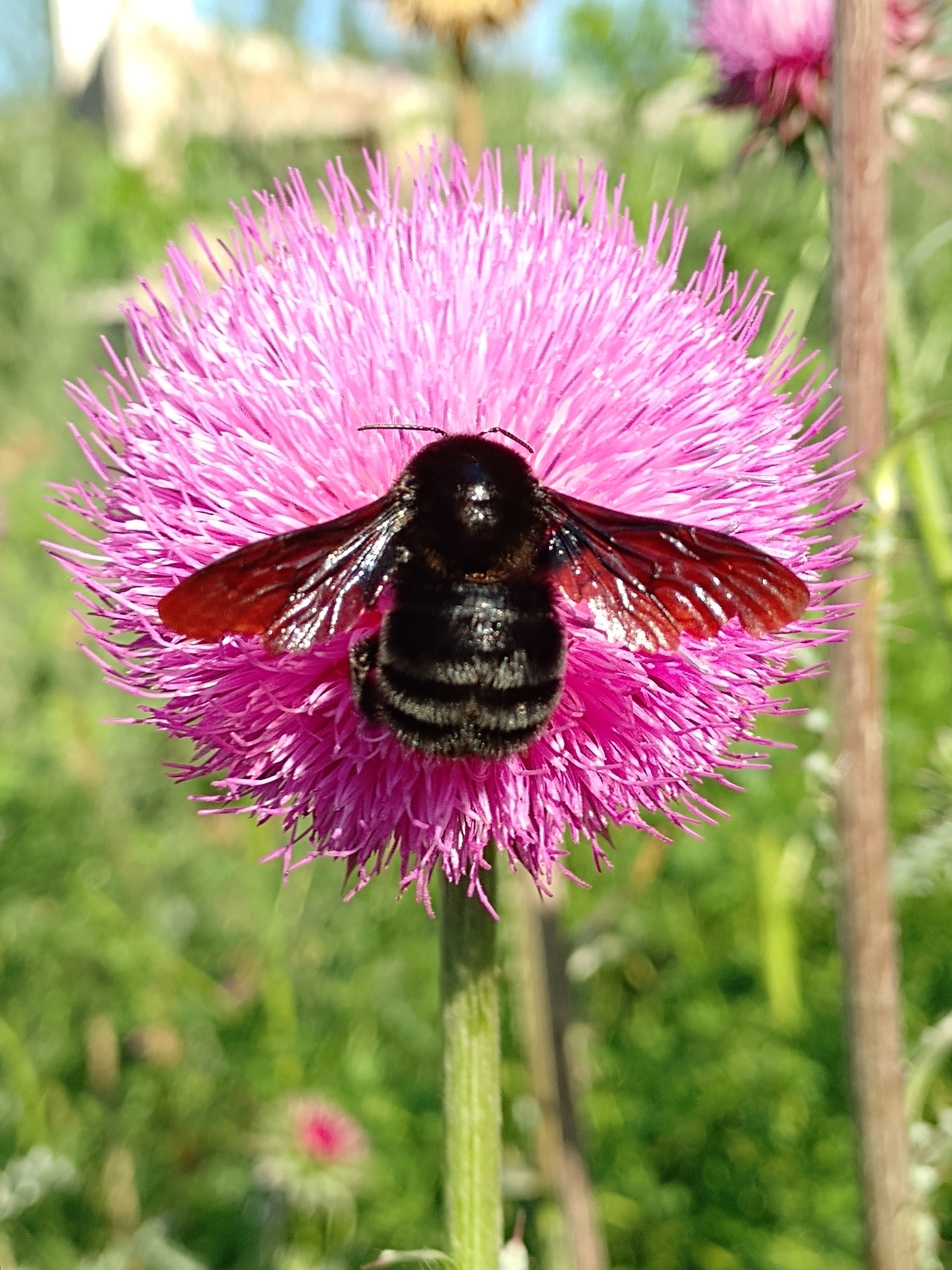
- Córdoba, Argentina

Conservation status
- Least Concern (IUCN 3.1)

Scientific classification
- Kingdom: Animalia
- Phylum: Arthropoda
- Clade: Pancrustacea
- Class: Insecta
- Order: Hymenoptera
- Family: Apidae
- Genus: Bombus
- Subgenus: Thoracobombus
- Species: B. pauloensis

Binomial name
- Bombus pauloensis Friese, 1913
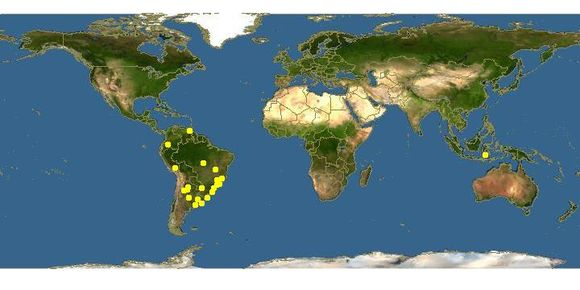
- Distribution of Bombus pauloensis

Synonyms
- Apis azurea Christ, 1791 (dubious); Bombus (Bombus) atratus Franklin, 1913 (Preocc.); Bombus cayennensis v. pauloensis Friese, 1913; Bombus cayennensis v. nigriventris Friese, 1913; Bremus atratus v. alternans Frison, 1925; Bremus atratus v. annulatus Frison, 1925; Bremus niger v. signatus Frison, 1925; Bombus cayennensis v. albidoanalis Friese, 1931; Bombus cayennensis v. buchwaldi Friese, 1931; Bombus cayennensis v. draenerti Friese, 1931; Bombus cayennensis v. jundiahyensis Friese, 1931; Bombus cayennensis v. paufer Friese, 1931; Bombus cayennensis v. uberabensis Friese, 1931; Bombus thoracicus v. umbricollis Friese, 1931

= Bombus pauloensis =

Species of bee

Bombus pauloensis is a neotropical bumblebee, formerly known as Bombus atratus, that is found throughout regions of South America, including Colombia, Ecuador, Brazil, Uruguay and Argentina. It lives in social colonies that include a founder queen/queens, workers and brood. B. pauloensis is somewhat unusual because of its potential to oscillate between polygynous (multiple queens) and monogynous (one queen) nesting cycles. Bombus pauloensis was the first species in the genus Bombus that was discovered to display such polygynous nesting patterns. The polygynous nesting cycles lead to certain specific types of behavior including queen-queen aggression. Nests can also be perennial, which is a characteristic rarely found in other bumblebees. B. pauloensis can be helpful to agricultural because of their ability to pollinate different species of plants. B. pauloensis has been found to occupy a range of geographic areas and climates throughout South America. Colonies have the ability to thermoregulate nests and keep them a little bit warmer than the outside environment. Foraging workers use muscle contractions to maintain stable temperatures and coupe with seasonal and daily fluctuations in temperature.

== Taxonomy and phylogenetics ==
B. pauloensis is a species of the genus Bombus in the family Apidae (honey bees, stingless bees, carpenter bees, bumblebees, orchid bees). Within Bombus, B. pauloensis is part of the formerly recognized New World subgenus Fervidobombus, which includes the closely relates species Bombus transversalis, and Bombus pullatus. Fervidobombus is currently part of the larger subgenus Thoracobombus. For most of the first century after its description in 1913, this species was known as Bombus atratus, but that name was a junior homonym, having been used for a different species of bumblebee in 1911. The names pauloensis and nigriventris had also been published for this species in 1913, and Brazilian researchers in 2012 adopted the former as the formal replacement for the name atratus.

== Description and identification ==
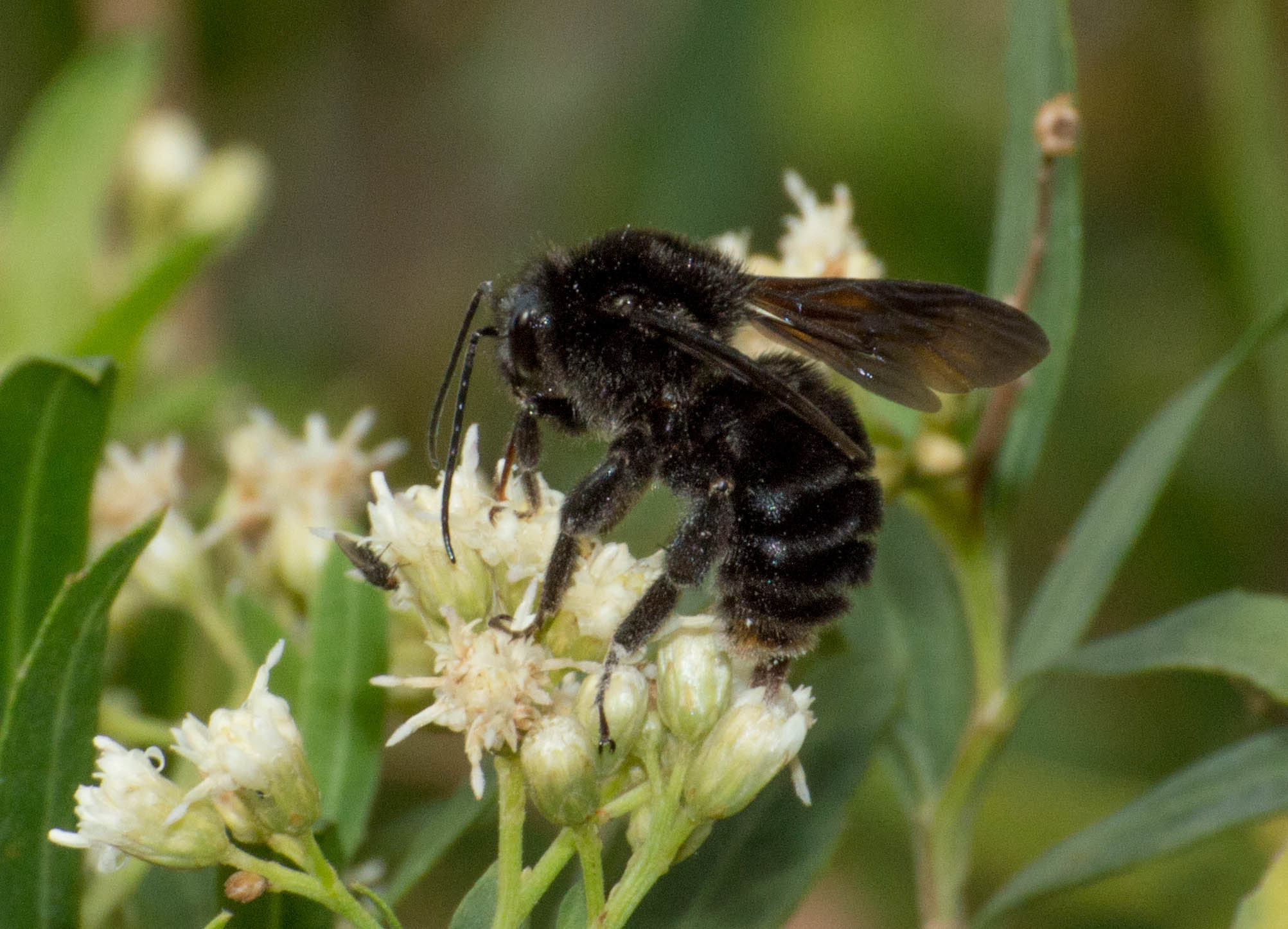
Buenos Aires, 2022

B. pauloensis are predominantly black in color. The thorax of the bee is completely black while the abdomen is black with a small amount of paler hair towards the apex. B. pauloensis have a long tongue that facilitates the process of retrieving nectar from flowers with deep corollas. The antennae of B. pauloensis are also relatively long. Workers have a wing length that ranges between 4 and 10 mm. Queens are usually two to three times the mass of workers.

== Distribution and habitat ==
B. pauloensis nests are usually found above the ground. Nests have been found in an array of different locations, including warm, tropical areas and cold, high altitude environments. Such a diverse geographic distribution illustrates how B. pauloensis has the ability to adapt to a wide range of conditions and pollen sources. Although most nests are built on the ground, nests have been found elevated in trees above the ground. Research indicates that climate dictates whether a particular nest will oscillate between polygynous and monogynous cycles. B. pauloensis are found throughout South America, including Colombia, Ecuador, Brazil, and Argentina.

== Nest architecture ==
Nests of B. pauloensis are circular in shape and have been observed to have a diameter of around 10–30 cm and a height of between 10–20 cm. For those nests found on the ground, the brood comb is usually located in slight cavities a couple of centimeters below ground level. The number of nest entrances varies and seems to be unrelated to any specific property of the colony, such as size. Although most nests usually have multiple entrances, one or two are more active than the others. All nest entrances are subject to intentional modifications by the workers that use the entrance. B. pauloensis also have the tendency of forming pollen feeding pockets that are attached to larval clusters to facilitate the larval feeding process.

== Colony cycle ==
The colony cycle begins when a solitary gyne (a foundress) constructs an egg cell in a slightly underground cavity. This egg cell/brood leads to the first set of workers and foragers that will help further colony propagation. In order to reproduce, the colony must reach the point where it can birth new drones and gynes. The progression to such a drone and gyne reproductive phase is not completely understood. The cycle technically completes when the queen dies, the reproductive gynes leave the nest, or both. Polygynous phases can begin (and often do begin) if the queen is replaced by more than one new reproductive queen. Monogynous phases are initiated by conflicting queen–queen interactions that kill all but one rival reproductive queens. Research indicates that B. pauloensis has the ability to form new colonies at any point in the year regardless of the season. It takes 6 days for eggs to develop, 12–13 days for them to go through the larval stage, 8–12 more days after that to proceed through the pupal stage, and another 24–34 days to fully mature. Egg development also may be slightly delayed in colonies that exist in low temperature, high altitude environments, so the colony cycle of B. pauloensis varies with the area that a population is found in.

== Behavior ==
=== Polygyny ===
Polygyny is extremely rare in the family Apidae, and B. pauloensis was the first recorded example of polygyny in bumblebees. Colonies found in high altitude and temperate regions typically conform to an annual cycle with one queen per colony. Colonies found in subtropical or tropical lowland regions seem to be perennial and oscillate between periods of polygyny and monogyny. Alternations occur between monogynous and polygynous life cycle phases occur two-three times a year, with the durations of each phase lasting from several weeks to months. During periods of polygyny, a nest may have up to several queens simultaneously, while periods of monogyny are marked by single queens. Polygyny gives rise to a set of aggressive queen–queen interactions (refer to section below) and dominance hierarchies (refer to section below).

=== Queen replacement ===
If the queen disappears or gets removed from the colony, she can be replaced by a false queen. This false queen produces both female and male offspring in order to maintain the colony's development and propagation until the following reproductive phase, which is when new queens are produced. The false queen is usually a mated worker. It has been shown that new colonies can be formed from groups of workers that lack a queen. In such cases, a false queen assumes the role of the queen (as described above) and allows for colony propagation and development until the reproductive phase when new queens are produced.

=== Social dominance hierarchy ===
The social dominance hierarchy for B. pauloensis is in large part due to the polygyny colony cycling. Dominant queens that have ascended the dominance scale have much greater access to the brood. Less dominant queens are often forced to the outside of the brood and sometimes are forced out of the nest/brood area entirely. While subordinate queens become the equivalent of workers, dominant queens have the most reproductive success and also usually live longer than their subordinate counterparts. Queen dominance is correlated with aggressive behaviors. One theory for why these subordinate remain in the nest relates to the possibility for egg resorption (egg resorption gives subordinate queens reason to not leave the nest and start their own).

=== Queen–queen interactions ===
Agonistic behaviors have been recorded between B. pauloensis queens in colonies that are in polygynous phases. These interactions are mainly a result of queens establishing and maintaining specific territories within the brood clump. In such environments, queens guard their brood clump territories by lunging at other queens that may intrude into their territory. Conflicts between queens in such environments can lead to the death and expulsion of rival queens by the dominant queen. After all of the other queens are expelled, the dominant queen will take over the colony and initiate the monogynous phase of the colony life cycle. Relative levels of queen aggression and dominance correlate with a number of physical indicators including, ovary size, age.

=== Queen behavior/role ===
A foundress starts a colony by constructing an egg cell in a cavity usually below the ground (aerial nests exist, but they are rare). The queen covers the egg cell with a protective wax coating. This foundress (also known as the solitary gyne) must assume complete responsibility before the first workers are spawned; she looks after the brood, and forages for the necessary nectar and pollen that are deposited into the feeding pockets that she attaches to larval clusters. Eventually the eggs of this initial brood mature into the first set of workers. Once this happens, the queen only rarely leaves the nest. The queen's main job shifts to laying and incubating eggs. The initial period during which the queen is alone and workers are not yet present is called the subsocial phase; the social phase begins when the initial eggs mature into workers that can begin tending to the nest and foraging.

=== Worker behavior/role ===
Foraging workers collect nectar and pollen. They deposit pollen into the larvae pockets and store the nectar in "pots". These foraging workers leave the nest constantly, and spend most of their time in the external environment around the nest. House workers stay within the nest and are tasked with tending to the brood. They feed and incubate the brood. In select nests, other B. pauloensis workers have been observed moving litter on and around the nest. These litter workers break and scrape up litter with their mandibles and handle them with their forelegs. They do not seem to move this litter into or out of the nest. The purpose of such "litter manipulating" behavior is unclear. Subordinate queens have sometimes been observed to assume the same role of house workers if they do not obtain the necessary brood clump territory to allow for reproductive success.

=== Foraging ===
B. pauloensis gather nectar and pollen from a wide variety of plant species. Nectar is usually stored in relatively small quantities in the form of honey within the nest. B. pauloensis shows slight preference when harvesting nectar, and more intensely harvests from certain flowers, including Eucalyptus spp., Lagerstroemia indica and Aptenia cordifolia. At least some of B. pauloensis nectar preference can be explained by their relatively long proboscis, which allows for a more efficient gathering of nectar from deeper flowers. When foraging for pollen, B. pauloensis is more selective and generally visits a smaller variety of plants. The increased restrictiveness involved with pollen foraging may indicate that the pollen foraging patterns evolved separately from nectar foraging ones.

=== Thermal regulation ===
Certain environments (i.e. tropical high altitude) witness large changes in temperature over the course of a day. These temperature fluctuations alter the daily flight activity patterns of B. pauloensis and other related species. In such environments, foraging is limited to the group of species that have the ability to properly regular body temperature. B. pauloensis workers regulate body temperature in a way that allows for functioning in such uncertain climates. Additionally, they regulate internal nest temperature. Nests are usually kept at a stable temperature that is a couple of degrees warmer than the outside environment. Such nest thermoregulation is a result of heat produced by specific muscular contractions by house workers. These muscular contractions are almost identical to those that foragers use to maintain core body temperature when in the colder, outside environment. The ability to regulate both body and nest temperatures improve B. pauloensis colonies' chance of survival when outside temperature fluctuate rapidly and fall to below freezing within hours or minutes.
