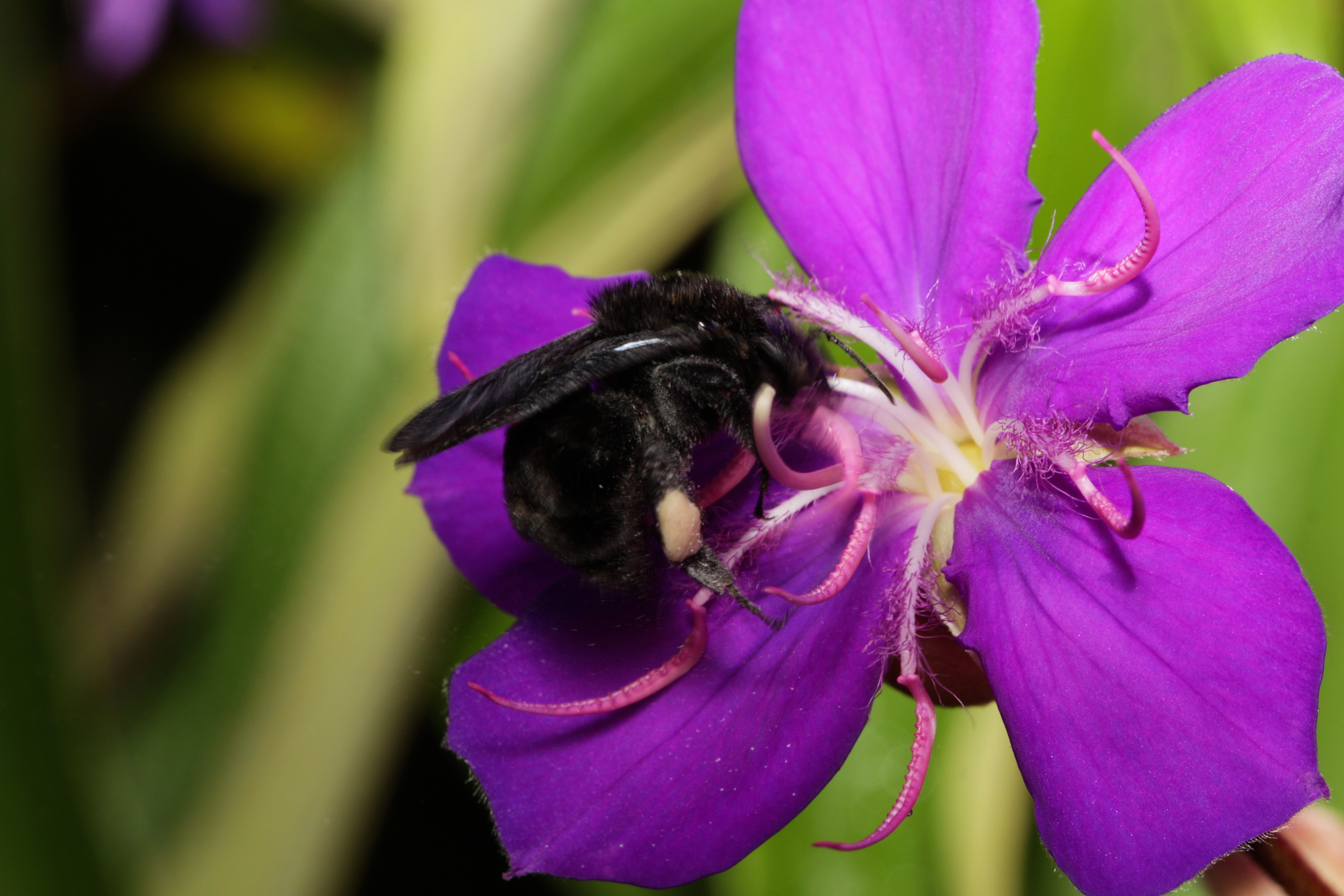

Conservation status
- Least Concern (IUCN 3.1)

Scientific classification
- Kingdom: Animalia
- Phylum: Arthropoda
- Clade: Pancrustacea
- Class: Insecta
- Order: Hymenoptera
- Family: Apidae
- Genus: Bombus
- Subgenus: Thoracobombus
- Species: B. morio

Binomial name
- Bombus morio (Swederus, 1787)

= Bombus morio =

Species of insect

Bombus morio is one of the few bumblebee species found in South America. These bees reside mainly in the forests of Brazil, nesting on the surface of the ground. They are one of the biggest species of bumblebee and are important pollinators. They are one of the few species of bees that exhibit buzz pollination to collect pollen from the flowers.

== Taxonomy and phylogeny ==
In South America, most of the bumble bees are distributed among the Andes mountains and in temperate regions, with a few species being observed in the warmer lowlands. Out of these bumble bees, only six are known to exist within Brazil, and they all belong in the same subgenus of Fervidobombus. Five of these six are very closely related, but the sixth, the Bombus morio, belong to a distinctive clade. Phylogenetic analysis has shown that the Bombus morio, are exclusively distinct.

== Habitat ==
There are known to be around 250 Bombus species. Most of these species occur in the northern climate zones of America and Eurasia. Only a few species reside in the southernregions, and one those is the Bombus morio. These bees are dependent on the forest, and reside in temperate regions of Brazil.

They reside in the mid-lands and are principally surface nesters. However, their nests can also be found below ground.

== Description and identification ==
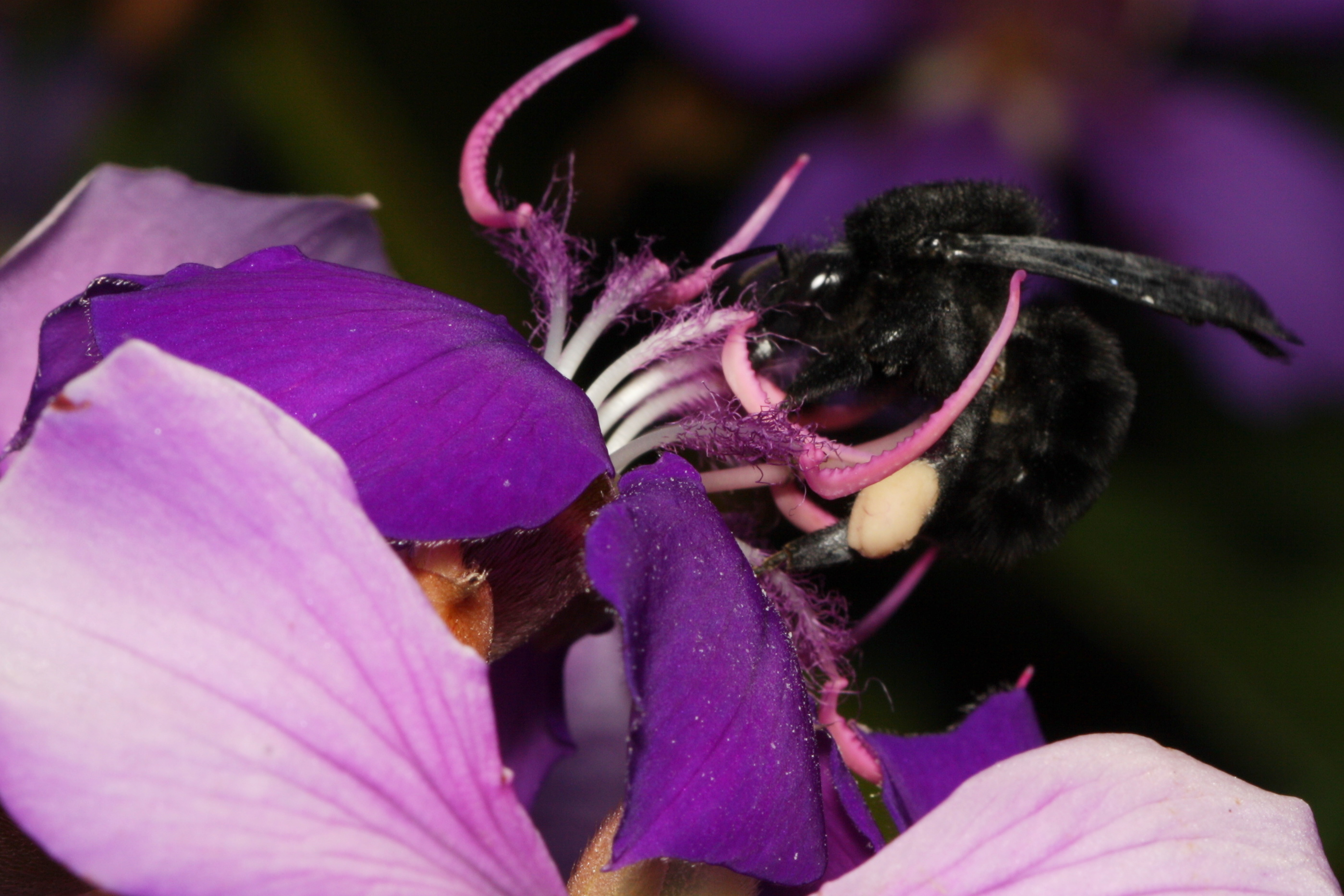

Bombus morio is a bumble bee, and thus shares certain features with other bumble bee species. They have three main body parts: head, thorax, and abdomen. The difference between female and male genders can be distinguished by the number of abdominal segments. For the female, there are 6 segments, while the male holds 7 segments. Additionally, the males have 13 segments on their antenna, while the females have 12. The females also have pollen baskets, a rimmed segment with long hairs on their back legs, which are used to carry pollen back to the nest, while males do not have pollen baskets.

=== Anatomy ===
==== Excretory organs ====
It is very important for the bumble bees to have bodily homeostasis over their body. However, Bombus morio does not have a rectal pad. Instead, the excretion system in Bombus morio, consisting of the Malpighian tubules, ileum, and rectum, gives the bees an efficient method of keeping homeostasis. An analysis of these organs showed that Bombus morio Malpighian tubules are made up of two cell types, and the ileum four types. The Malpighian tubules are significant for excretory features by throwing out excess and unnecessary solutes. Ileum, on the other hand, has the function of balancing the ion, water, organic compounds, and protein balance in the body. Together, the two organs work together to achieve homeostasis within Bombus morios bodies despite the lack of rectal papillae.

==== Mucous gland ====
The male mucous gland is present in most species of bees. Although the function of these mucous glands are largely unknown, research has been done on Bombus morio to discover the mystery nature of the glands. A histochemical study on these glands showed that the glands are made up of a pair of thick, big tubular structures. They cause the distal portion more dilated and corn shaped. The glands were evolved though protein synthesis, as RNA of the cytoplasm and nucleoli can be observed. Analysis has discovered that the gland secretion is very complex, as proteins, neutral polysaccharide, as well as lipids are released by these glands.

==== Midgut ====
The midgut of Bombus morio is made up of three cell types that play crucial roles in the digestion, absorption, and hormone production. The differences in the three types of cells, digestive, regenerative, and endocrine cells, can be seen by the difference in number, nuclear size, and the size of the striated border. When examined ultrastructurally, the digestive cells stood out with their long microvilli. Importantly, the anterior regions of the midgut showed dilated basal labyrinths and openings for the hemocoel, but the posterior regions showed the opposite characteristics. This provided evidence that Bombus morio has the ecto-endoperitrophic circulation.

== Colony cycle ==
Not much is known about the colony cycle of the Bombus morio. There have been some hints about the length of their cycles, however. The longevity of individual workers within a eusocial bee species is one of the most important indicators of colony growth and reproductive rates of bee colonies. In the Bombus morio, the average worker bee lives about 41.3 days. Additionally, the egg-to-adult period is about 32 days for workers, 35 days for males, and 32 for queens. These lengths are longer than the average and indicate slow colony growth.

== Behavior ==
=== Mating ===
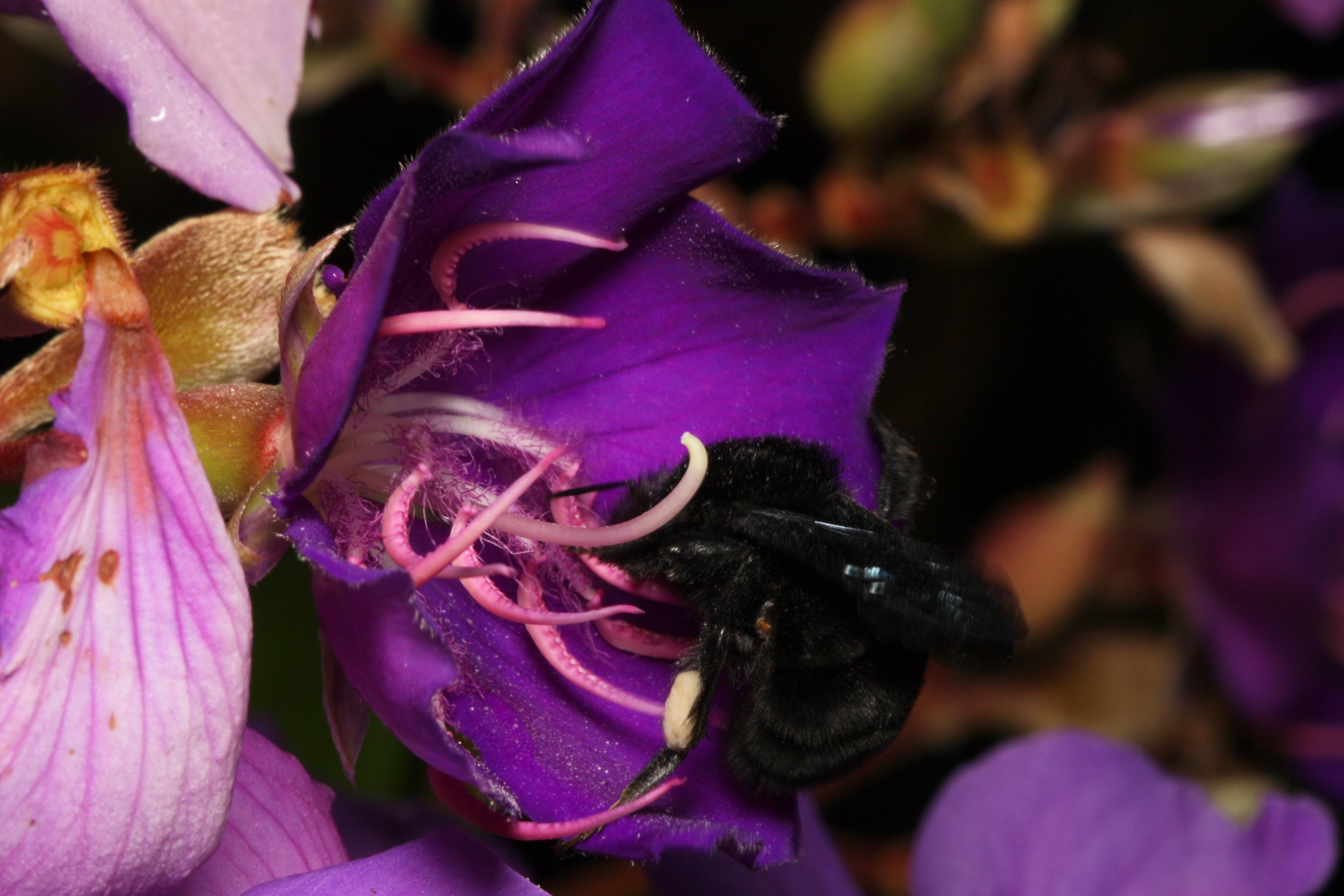
Foraging Bee

The ovaries of the queens of the Bombus morio can remain fully functional for a long period of the life of the queen. Some of the virgin queens may be isolated to induce oviposition when they reach the age of 40 days. When the virgin queen is still in the colony with an existing queen, they will instead assume the role of a worker. Hence, for ovaries of the queens are about 25 days, the oocytes may be reabsorbed. Queens do not need to mate to produce males.

=== Foraging ===
The foraging behavior of Bombus morio is similar to that of A. mellifera, and M. quadrifasciata. The Bombus morio may start foraging behavior 0–5 days after emergence. They reach the flowers to collect nectar. To do so, they position themselves vertically in between the sexual structures of the flowers and the corolla. Their backs are always directed towards the floral axis. In this manner, the Bombus morio are able to remove the pollen from the anthers of the flowers with stamens. This, combined with its deposition on the stigma of flowers with pistils, allow the Bombus morio to be extremely effective pollinators. The limitation they have as pollinators is that their large body restricts them from reaching smaller flowers. It was observed that a single visit from the Bombus morio was enough for pollination systems to lead to fruitification.

The Bombus Morio mainly forage during the morning. The main pollen collection period is around 6:00 to 8:00 pm. However, nectar can be collected until 5:00pm.

=== Buzz Pollination ===
The Bombus morio display a specific type of behavior to release the pollen from the flowers called the buzz pollination. They land on the flowers and hold the stamens with their legs. Once the stamens are in place, the bee vibrates with its body curved. This is a very effective method of dislodging the pollen, and helps the Bombus morio be very effective pollinators.

== Nesting ==
The Bombus morio make their nests in the neotropical regions on the surface of the ground. Like most bees the nests are made mostly of wax, and their brooding area containing the larvae of works, queen, and male are located in the middle of the nest.

They show opportunistic behavior in relation to nesting sites and the brood envelope, and present aggressive behavior like other neotropical species. They attempt to sting and spit substances that irritate predators away from their nests.

== Sting ==
The sting of the Bombus morio is known to be potent and hazardous. When humans are stung by the Bombus morio, serious injury and even death can occur when not properly taken care of. When stung, victims experience immediate intense pain, and a reddish-orange spot appears, indicating bleeding traumatic lesions at the site of the bite. Within two hours of the bite, the stings can cause nausea, chill, and vomits, which can be paired with heavy sweating, dizziness, and headache. The feces excreted by victims will be dark-brown.

== Parasites ==
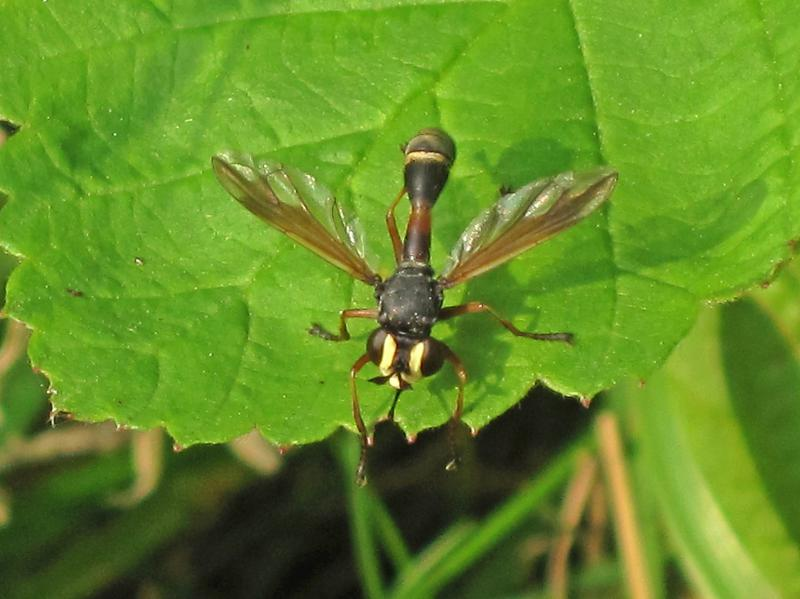
Physocephala fly

Some parasites are known to reside in Bombus morio. One of these parasites is the tachinid fly larvae that can be found inside the abdomen of foraging females. The parasite does not affect the flight behavior of the host bee, nor does it affect the midgut or the ventral nerve cord. However, the parasite can completely damage the ovaries.

Another parasite associated to Bombus morio is Physocephala, a conopid fly. The bees that host these parasites die within ten days after the oviposition by the fly. Like the tachinid fly larvae, the conopid fly larvae also lodges itself in the abdominal cavity of the bee.
