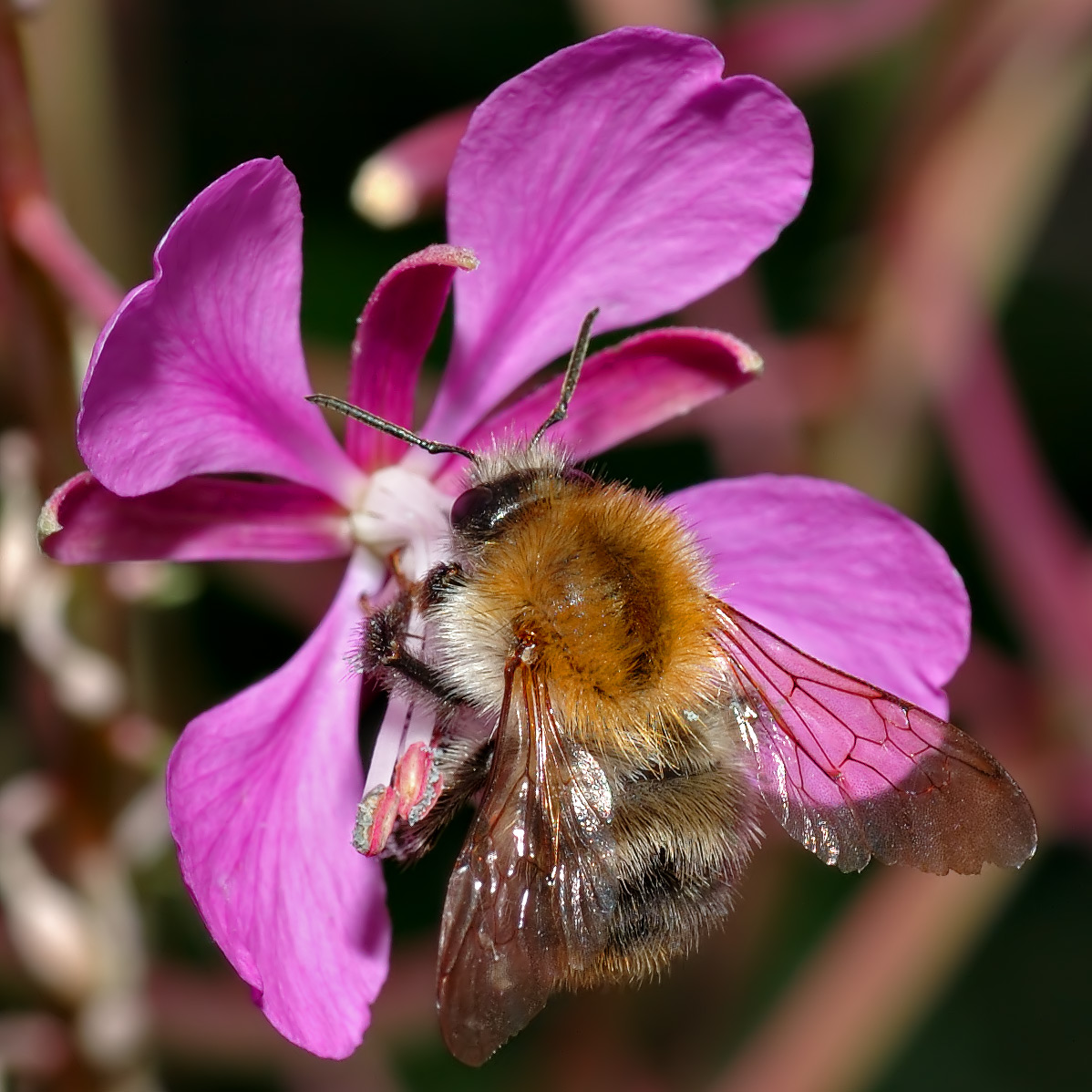
- Worker
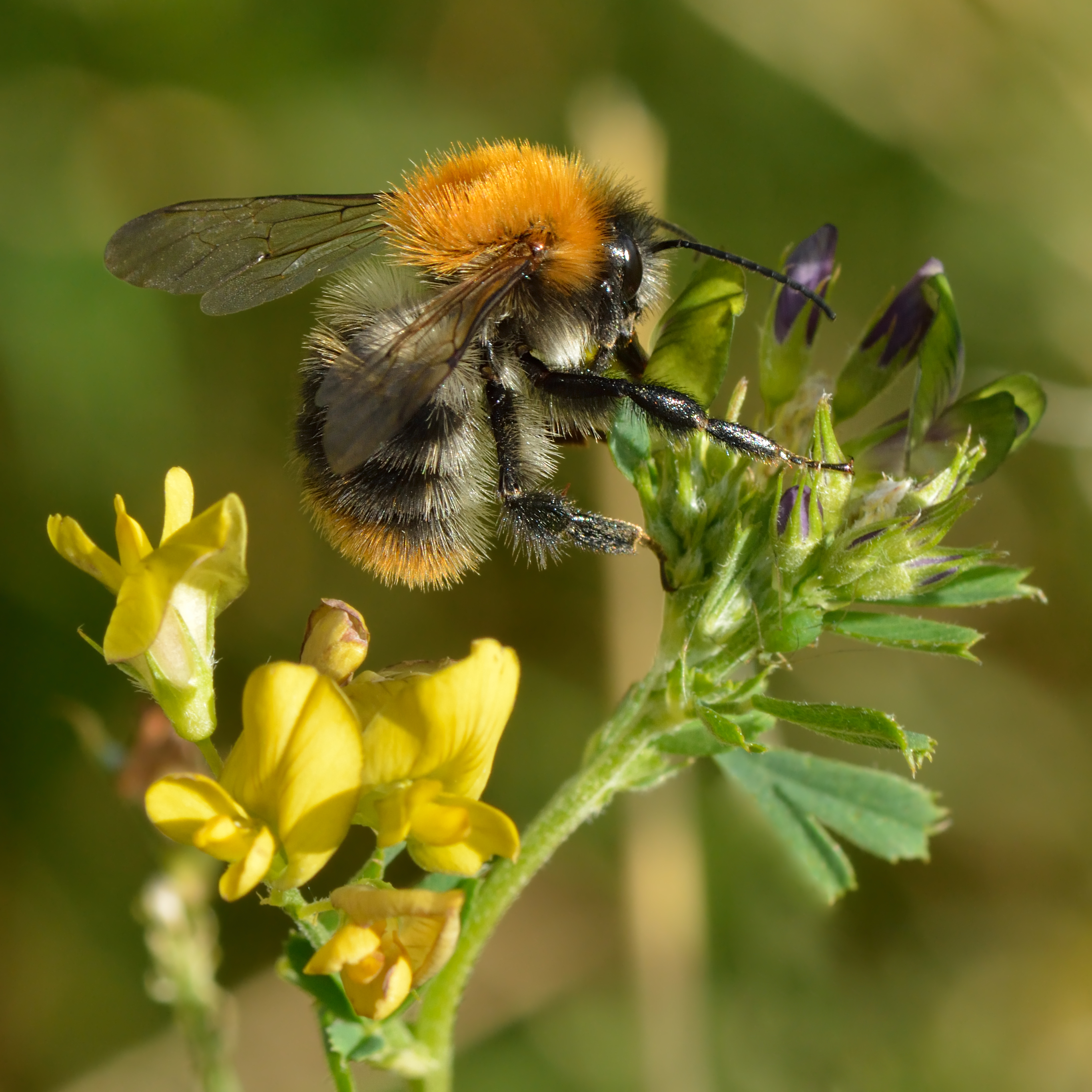
- Male

Scientific classification
- Kingdom: Animalia
- Phylum: Arthropoda
- Clade: Pancrustacea
- Class: Insecta
- Order: Hymenoptera
- Family: Apidae
- Genus: Bombus
- Species: B. pascuorum

Binomial name
- Bombus pascuorum (Scopoli, 1763)

Synonyms
- Apis pascuorum Scopoli, 1763; Apis senilis Fabricius, 1775; Apis agrorum Fabricius, 1787, non Schrank, 1781; Bombus thoracicus Spinola, 1806; Bombus arcticus Dahlbom, 1832, non Quenzel, 1832; Bombus cognatus Stephens, 1846; Bombus smithianus White, 1851

= Bombus pascuorum =

Species of bee

Bombus pascuorum, the common carder bee, is a species of bumblebee present in most of Europe in a wide variety of habitats such as meadows, pastures, waste ground, ditches and embankments, roads, and field margins, as well as gardens and parks in urban areas and forests and forest edges. It is similar in appearance to Bombus muscorum, and is replacing that species in northern Britain.

== Description ==
The thorax of the common carder bee is either yellowish or reddish-brown in color. The hair of the first four abdominal segments is gray, while the hair of the fifth and sixth terga is yellowish or reddish-brown.

The body length of queens ranges from 15 to 18 mm (0.59 to 0.71 in) in length. The body length of female workers ranges from 9 to 15 mm (0.35 to 0.59 in) in length. The body length of males range from 12 to 14 mm (0.47 to 0.55 in) in length. Queens measure 28 to 32 mm (1.1 to 1.3 in) from wing to wing. Workers measure 24 to 27 mm (0.94 to 1.06 in) from wing to wing. Drones measure 24 to 27 mm (0.94 to 1.06 in) from wing to wing.

The head of the common carder bee is of medium length and the snout is long compared to other species of bumblebee. The snout of the queen ranges between 13 and 15 mm (0.51 and 0.59 in) in length. The snout of workers ranges from 12 to 13 mm (0.47 to 0.51 in) in length. The snout of drones ranges from 10 to 11 mm (0.39 to 0.43 in) in length.

== Colony cycle ==
Queens appear between early April and mid-May, and workers appear at the end of April/early May to mid-October. Young queens and drones can be found from mid-August to late October. When queens search for suitable places to nest, they fly just above the vegetation, for example on forest edges, investigating cavities such as holes in the ground or niches in dead wood and grass. The nests can be constructed above or under ground, preferably in old mouse nests, but also in bird nests, barns, and sheds.

Nest-building proceeds as follows. The queen collects moss and grass to form a small, hollow sphere whose walls are partly bonded with wax and sealed off. Within this is formed a large bowl of brown wax of about 5 mm in diameter, which is filled with pollen. Thereafter, five to 15 eggs are deposited, and the cell closed. Another 20-mm-high cup is then filled with nectar, thus serving as its own food reserve for bad weather days. After three to five days, the larvae hatch to feed on the pollen. After about a week, the larvae are mature.

The adult worker bees, owing to the initially poor supply situation, are relatively small, reaching only about half the body length of the queen and lacking functioning ovaries. Later-hatching bees are much larger. The additional nesting and brood care is dedicated solely to the queen, which no longer leaves the nest. From August, rarely before, the first fully developed females, together with drones, are ready. Drones hatch from unfertilized eggs.

In August the B. pascuorum nest, with a diameter of up to 15–20 cm (5.9–7.9 in), reaches a maximum population size from 60 to 150 individuals. Shortly after this peak, the population quickly decreases. With the queen the entire nest dies, usually in September. Occasionally, individuals survive until October/November. Only the last-hatched females survive, to mate with males. Then they fly in search of a safe place for hibernation.

== Foraging ==
The common carder bee is polylectic, feeding on a variety of wild flowers, including nettles (Urticaceae), genuine motherwort (Lamiaceae), Himalayan balsam (Balsaminaceae), cabbage thistle, knapweed (Asteraceae), vetches, red and white clover (Fabaceae), monkshood (Ranunculaceae), fruit trees, etc.

== Gallery ==
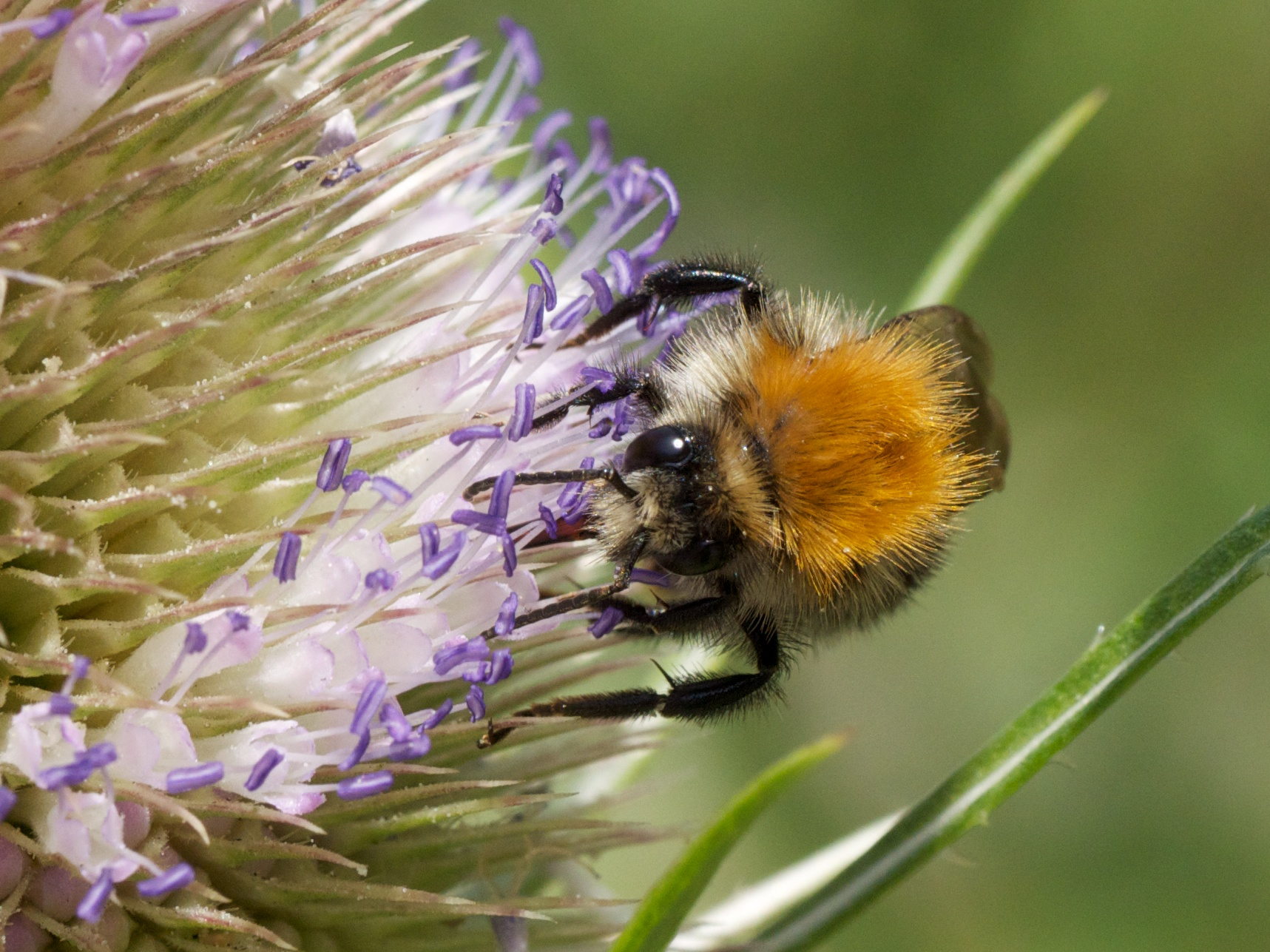

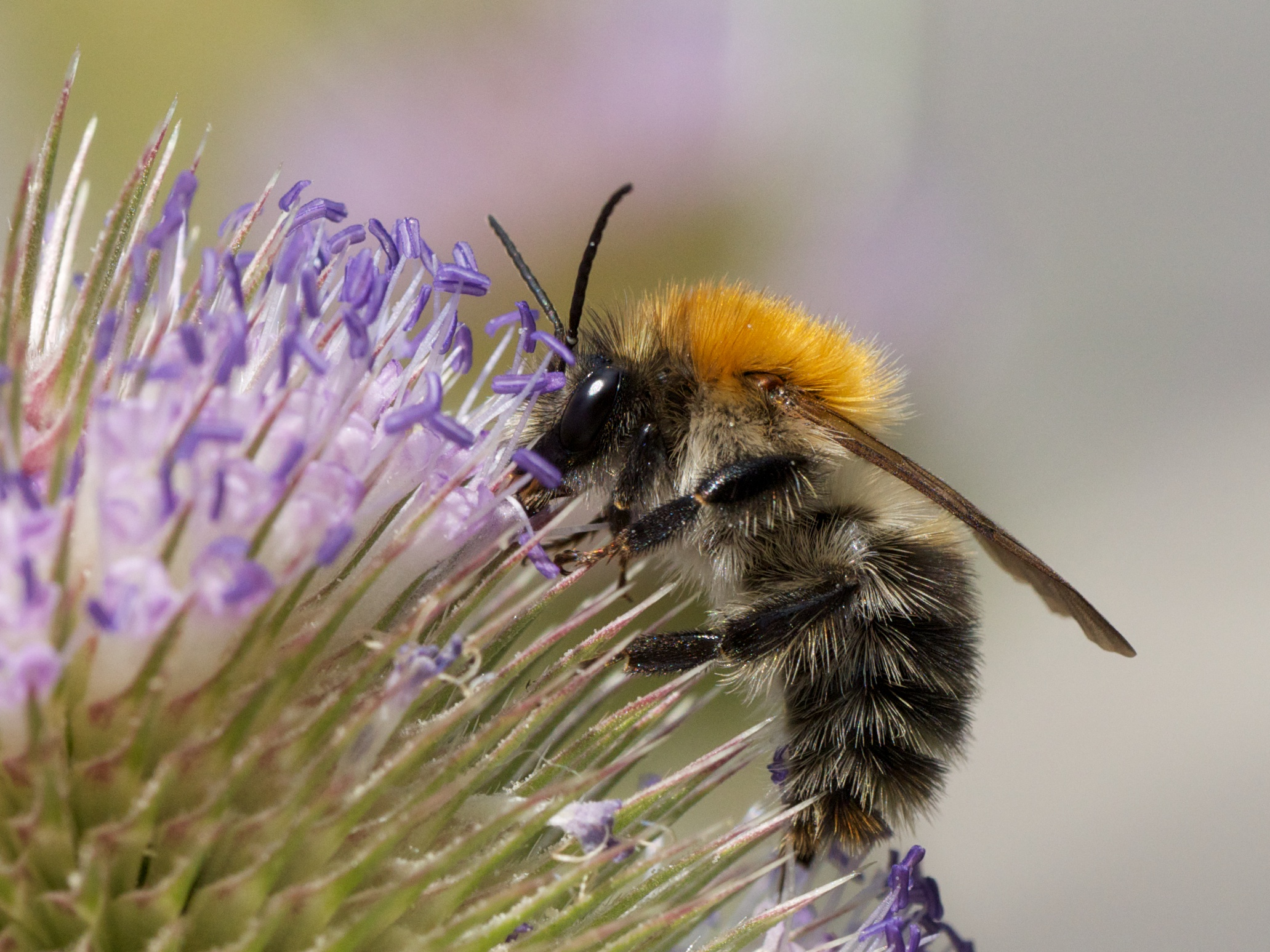

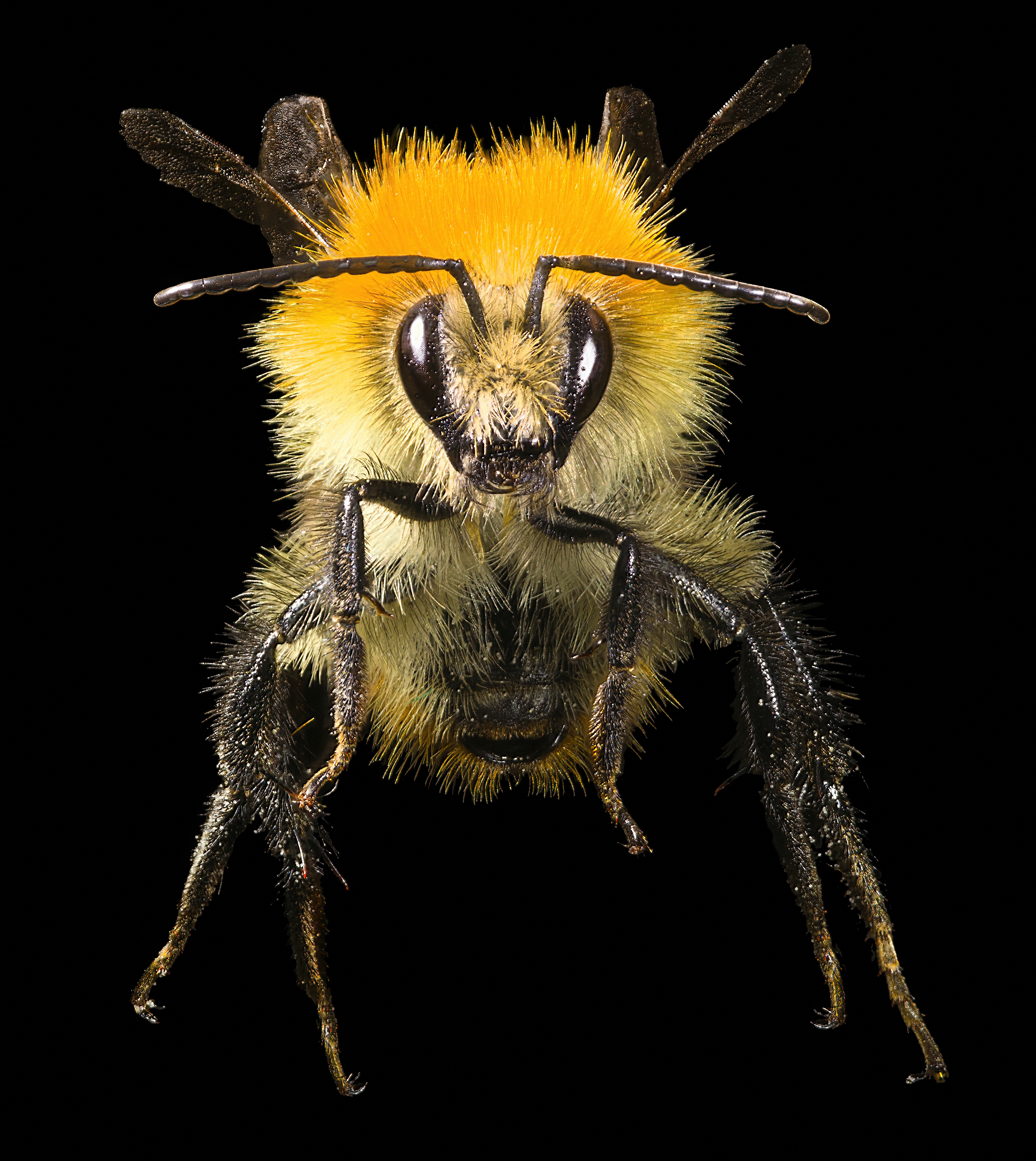

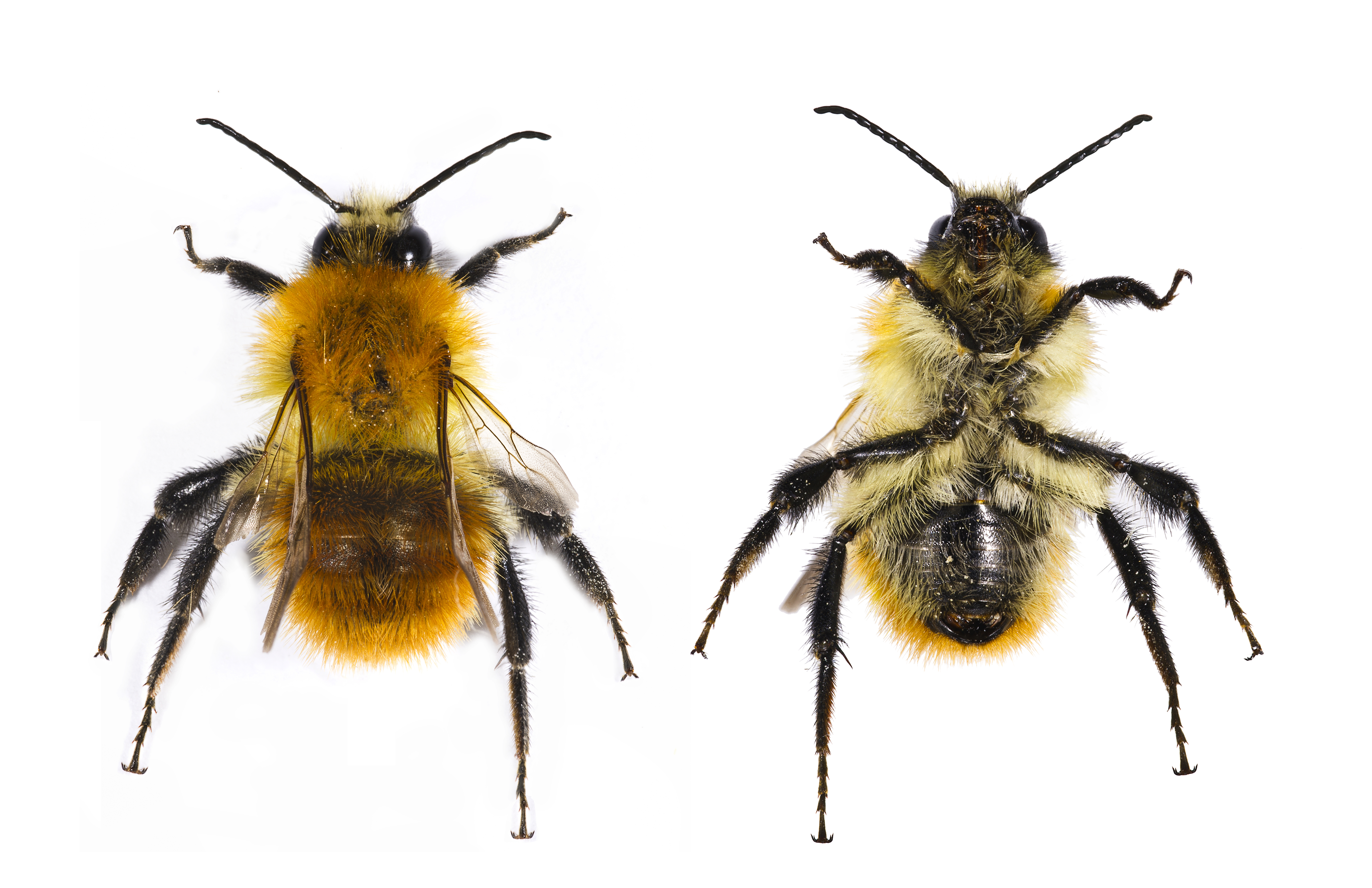

Foraging behavior of Eucera longicornis (male) and Bombus pascuorum in Norway

On a Dahlia.
