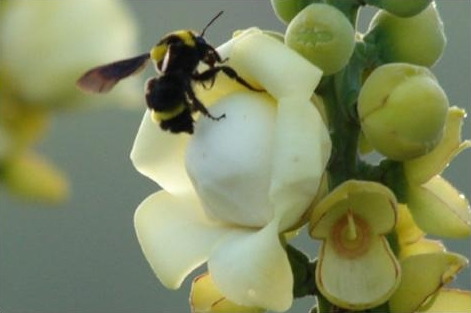

Conservation status
- Least Concern (IUCN 3.1)

Scientific classification
- Kingdom: Animalia
- Phylum: Arthropoda
- Clade: Pancrustacea
- Class: Insecta
- Order: Hymenoptera
- Family: Apidae
- Genus: Bombus
- Subgenus: Thoracobombus
- Species: B. transversalis

Binomial name
- Bombus transversalis (Olivier, 1789)

= Bombus transversalis =

Species of bee

Bombus transversalis is a bumblebee specifically native to the Amazon Basin. It is most notable for its surface-level colonies which are built by the workers on the rainforest floor. Unlike its relatives, B. transversalis is able to thrive in a humid climate and fend off a wide range of predators because of its resilient nests. While there is great deal of information pertaining to their nests and foraging abilities, there is much more to be learned about relationships within the colony and life cycle of the bee.

== Taxonomy and phylogenetics ==
Bombus transversalis is in the order Hymenoptera, which consists of bees, ants, wasps, and sawflies. It is in the family Apidae and in the genus Bombus. Most Bombus live in temperate climates and build their nests underground from abandoned tunnels. Bombus transversalis has adapted to tropical climates and builds its nests on ground surface. It is classified under the subgenus Thoracobombus. An example of a related species would be Bombus pauloensis. However, Bombus transversalis is the only one of this subgenus known to build their own nests out of leaves and twigs.

== Distribution and habitat ==
Bombus transversalis is primarily found in the lowland tropical rain forests of the Amazon Basin. They can be found throughout much of South America, including parts of Peru, Ecuador and Brazil. They are generally seen as the bumblebee colonizers of Neotropical rain forests. As such, they are adapted to surviving in a humid climate with heavy rainfall throughout the year. Their nests are found in soil which is not flooded. They are generally built next to the roots of trees or among shrubs for support.

== Colony cycle ==
The Bombus transversalis colony cycle is based on the season of the year. Colonies are formed during the wet season. During this time the colony is continually developing. When the dry season comes, they become reproductively active for a few months. However, once the wet season comes around again, the life of the colony comes to an end and a new colony is eventually formed when the queen finds a suitable site.

== Foraging ==
=== Alerting ===
While the Bombus transversalis is unique in its distribution, nesting, and foraging, it is still a social bee. It has been shown to have similar behavior to that of the Bombus terrestris, a well-studied bumblebee. It was thence shown that although the two bees are distantly related, the Bombus transversalis still shows behavior of alerting its colony about food sources leading to increased activity in and out of the nest.

=== Trails ===
It has been observed that B. transversalis uses walking trails similar to those of ants. These trails extend out from the nest in opposite directions and are patrolled by at least 20 workers who collect materials and forage along the trails. Workers on the trail cut leaves and debris into tiny pieces and push them to the side as they create trails. It has been observed that workers do this process in pairs, as they push debris to their fellow worker behind them. As such, lines of five or more bees have been observed walking along trails nearby their nest. One purpose of these trails is to forage. This is unique because most bees forage via flight.

== Nest ==
=== Structure ===
The structure of the Bombus transversalis nest is very complex. It is cone-like in shape with two separate combs. Oftentimes it is built off of existing nests, so there are many unused cells. The brood comb is built at the top and is surrounded by large honey silos. Some are filled with honey, but most are empty, as there is an abundant amount of storage. There is one single entrance to the colony. It is open and uncamouflaged but is usually guarded by 2–5 worker bees. Entirety of the colony is covered in a heap of twigs, leaves, and roots which serve as a canopy. This heap is very dense and waterproof. It also provides an air space which helps the bees manage the temperature and humidity of the nest.

=== Construction ===
Another purpose of the trails created by Bombus transversalis is to build up the structure of the nest. Using the twigs, leaves, and litter on the forest floor, worker bees cut up the debris into fragments and then bring these pieces back to the nest to build onto the canopy. As long as the trails are continuously being used, workers will continue to clear the trails even if leaves fall from the trees above. As such, the trails which have been observed of the Bombus transversalis serve a dual purpose in both foraging and nest construction.

=== Selection ===
A queen Bombus transversalis must choose its nesting site very carefully if she hopes to have a successful colony. First, she must choose an area which has ideal soil and will not flood when it rains a lot. Secondly, she must find adequate structural support for her nest. Oftentimes, this will take form in the roots of a large tree or among saplings and shrubs. This will give the workers a base to build the canopy for the colony and provide adequate shade for the nest.

== Controlling environment ==
Most Bombus bees live in temperate climates and cannot withstand the humidity and heat of the tropics. The Bombus transversalis has adapted so that it can be resilient. Because of the structure of its nest with an interwoven canopy covering the colony, the bees are able to remain dry even during Amazonian deluges. A well-constructed canopy creates a small air space between the canopy and the brood and is able to insulate the colony and balance the moisture. A weak colony will allow moisture into that air space, resulting in mold. Additionally, it is believed that when the sun is at its hottest, workers will stand at the entrance of the colony and fan the nest to reduce temperature and humidity.

== Interactions with other species ==
=== Army ants ===
Since Bombus transversalis builds its nest on rainforest floors, it is very susceptible to predators on the ground. One such predator is the army ant Eciton hamatum. In a 100m^{2} area on the forest floor, there is a 50% chance of being raided by army ants over an eight-month period. The main defensive mechanism of Bombus transversalis against these attacks is through its nest structure. The colony is covered with a dense canopy of leaves and roots. So, the only way to invade the colony is through the single nest entrance which remains guarded if it is not raining. While this does not prevent all attacks, it is an effective mechanism at times.

=== Parasitoid wasps and moths ===
Bombus transversalis is known to be parasitized by moths. The process of this is puzzling since the nest only has one entrance and is usually well-guarded. Somehow the moths are able to sneak through the entrance or are willingly allowed to pass through into the nest. At that the point, the moth larvae will then feed on the host cells. Through observation of the Bombus transversalis and these moths, a new parasitoid wasp in the genus Apanteles was also discovered.
