= Charles Victor Naudin =

French naturalist and botanist (1815–1899)

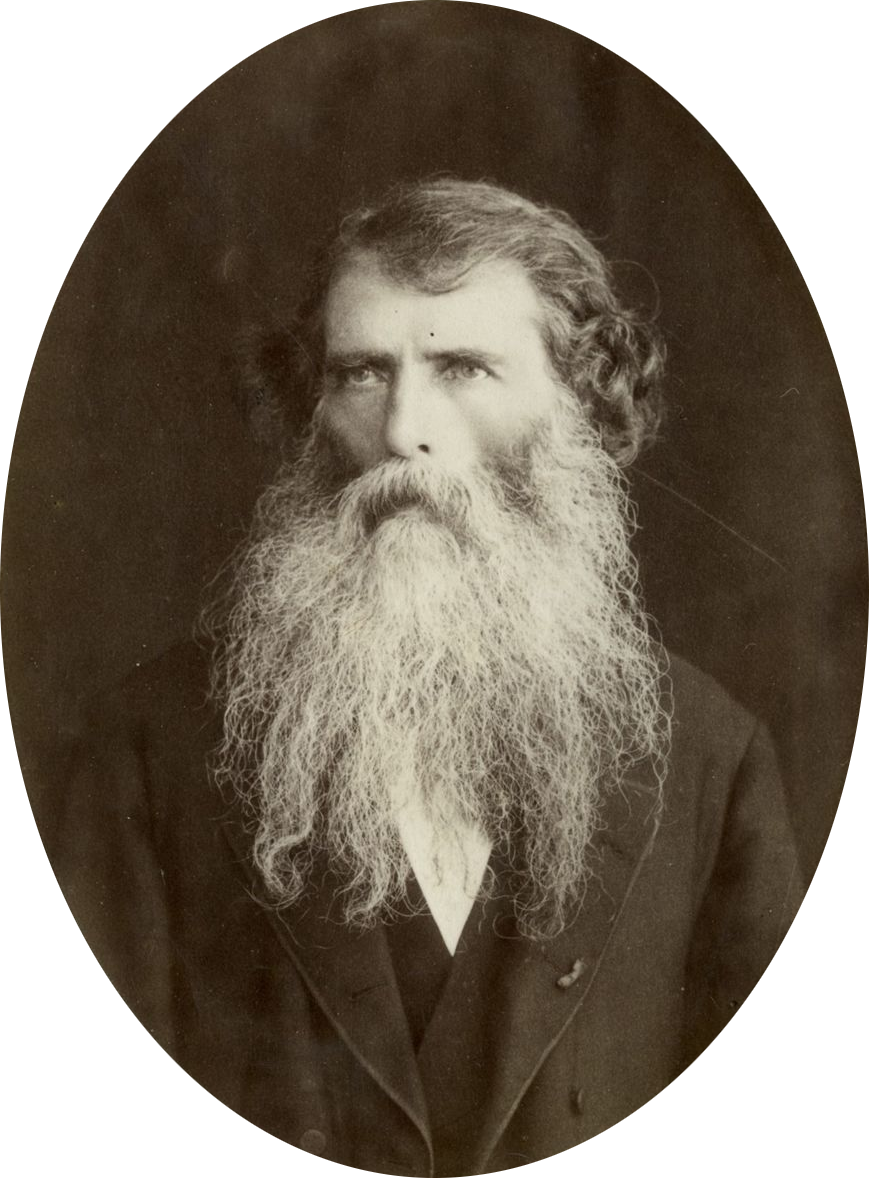
- Naudin in 1881
- Born: 14 August 1815; Autun, France
- Died: 19 March 1899 (aged 83); Antibes, France
- Scientific career
- Fields: Natural history, botany
- Thesis: Études sur la végétation des Solanées, la disposition de leurs feuilles et leurs inflorescences (1842)
- Author abbrev. (botany): Naudin

Charles Victor Naudin (14 August 1815 in Autun – 19 March 1899 in Antibes) was a French naturalist and botanist.

== Biography ==
Naudin studied at Bailleul-sur-Thérain in 1825, at Limoux, and at the University of Montpellier from which he graduated in 1837. The following year he was working as a private tutor; he obtained his doctorate in 1842. He taught until 1846, when he joined the herbarium of the National Museum of Natural History. He collaborated with Augustin Saint-Hilaire on the publication of the Brazilian flora and introduced the first seeds of Jubaea chilensis in France.

In 1853, botanists Planch. & Linden published Naudinia is a monotypic genus of flowering plants from Colombia belonging to the family Rutaceae, and named in Naudin's honour.

He taught at Chaptal College as professor of zoology, but a neurological disease left him deaf. He became an assistant naturalist in 1854 and married in 1860. He entered the Academy of Sciences in 1863 where he succeeded Horace Benedict Alfred Moquin-Tandon.

He moved to Collioure in 1869 and created a private experimental garden there. He also made there the first local complete weather study, which lasted ten years.

In 1878 he was appointed director of the botanical garden of Villa Thuret of Antibes (now an INRA laboratory). He worked closely with Jacques Nicolas Ernest Germain de Saint-Pierre.

He was losing his sight. In spite of this he continued to run experiments on hybridization and the acclimation of plants for the production of new species. He studied heredity, and the flora of Brazil, and in 1860 he described twenty kinds of pumpkins.

Both Charles Darwin and Gregor Mendel studied his work, which is considered a precursor of modern genetics.

== Natural selection ==
In the Revue Horticole (1852), Naudin described the concept of natural selection. J. Arthur Thomson has noted:

De Quatrefages and De Varigny have maintained that the botanist Naudin stated the theory of evolution by natural selection in 1852. He explains very clearly the process of artificial selection, and says that in the garden we are following Nature's method. "We do not think that Nature has made her species in a different fashion from that in which we proceed ourselves in order to make our variations." But, as Darwin said, "he does not show how selection acts under nature." Similarly it must be noted in regard to several pre-Darwinian pictures of the struggle for existence (such as Herder's, who wrote in 1790 "All is in struggle...each one for himself" and so on), that a recognition of this is only the first step in Darwinism.

== Bibliography ==
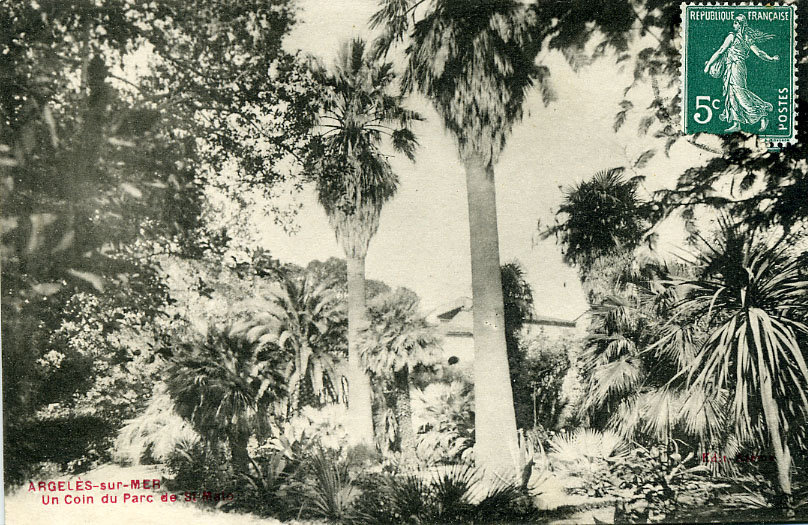
The two Washingtonia planted by Charles Naudin at Villa Saint Malo in Argelès.

His main publication is Mémoire sur les hybrides du règne végétal which appeared in Recueil des savants étrangers and won him the Grand Prize of the Institute of Botany in 1862. The study of hereditary phenomena according to his designs is now known as Naudinism, which asserts that species are formed in the same way as our cultivated varieties, whose formation Naudin attributed to systematic selection by Man.

He was interested in the diversification of plants and in particular of pumpkins. Contrary to the generally accepted view, he established the non-permanence of hybrids. The botanist also published a series of memoirs dealing with cosmic influences, and published numerous articles in the Journal of Horticulture. He worked on various treaties and codes of agriculture and horticulture.

His handbook Manuel de l'acclimateur (Paris, 1888) is a reference work on the acclimatization of the Riviera in the 19th century. During his stay in Collioure, he participated in the planting of palms, including two Washingtonia, at the villa of the Baron de Saint Malo Vilmarest in Argeles-sur-Mer.

== See also ==
- Category:Taxa named by Charles Victor Naudin
