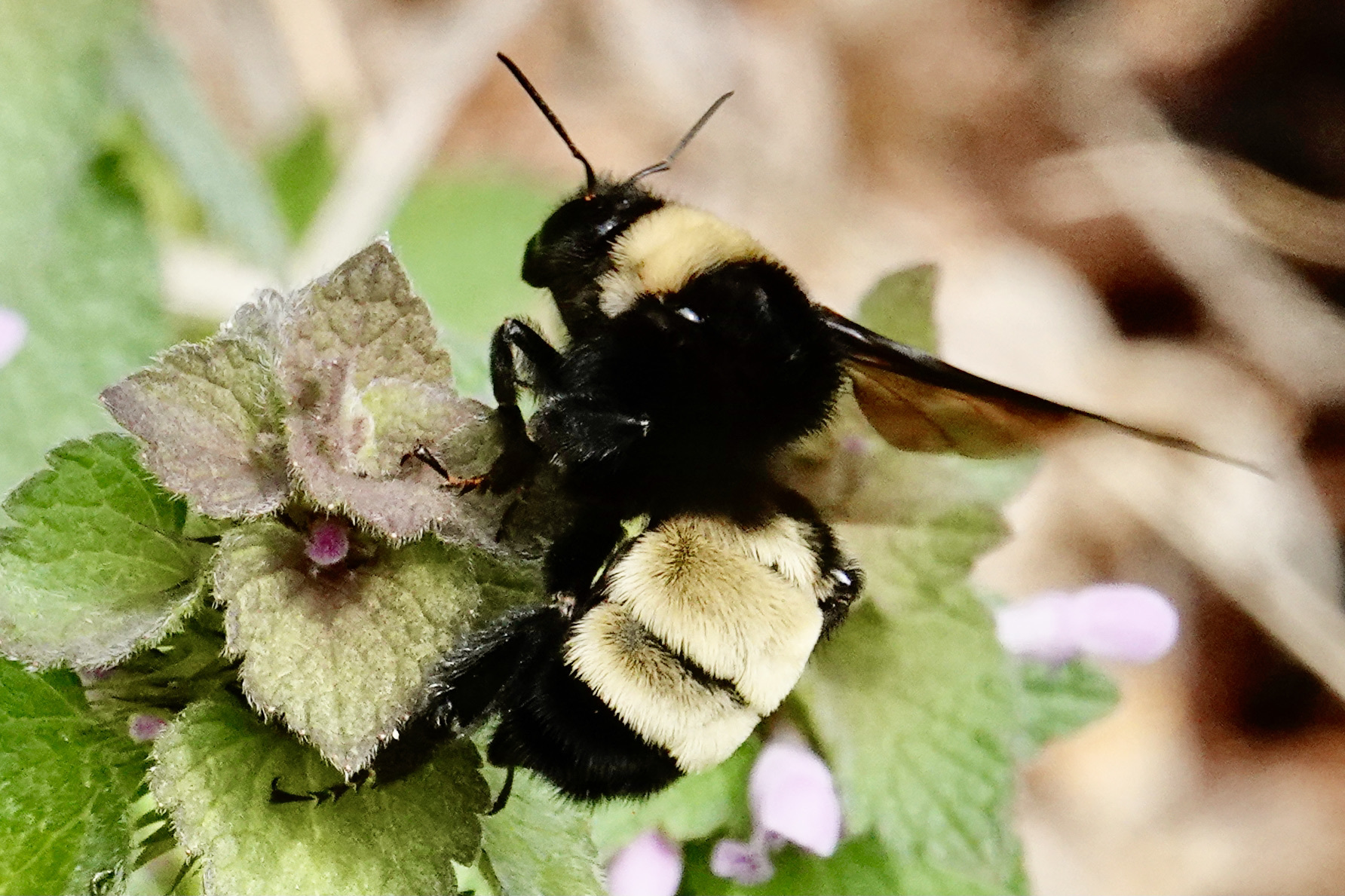
- Queen in Hanover County, VA
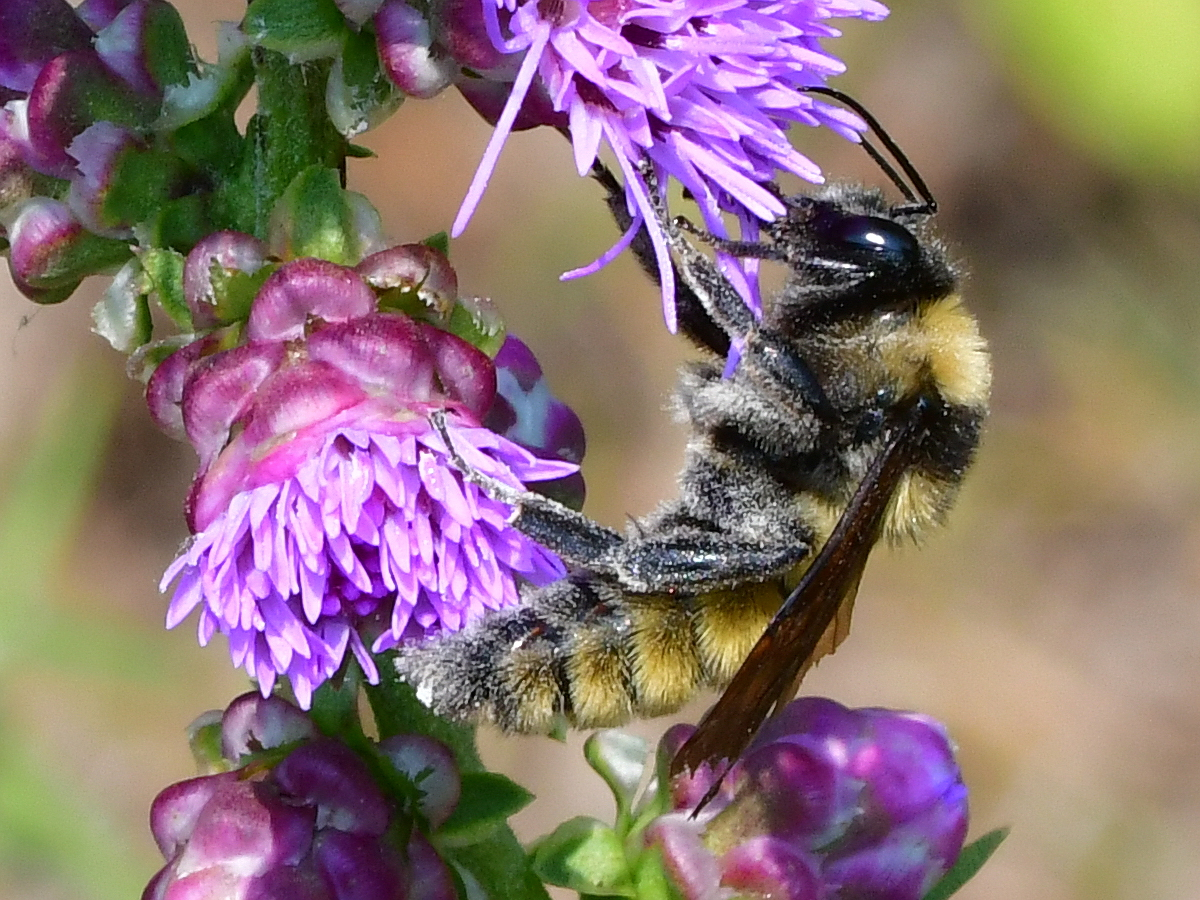
- Male in Illinois, US

Conservation status
- Vulnerable (IUCN 3.1)

Scientific classification
- Kingdom: Animalia
- Phylum: Arthropoda
- Class: Insecta
- Order: Hymenoptera
- Family: Apidae
- Genus: Bombus
- Subgenus: Thoracobombus
- Species: B. pensylvanicus

Binomial name
- Bombus pensylvanicus (De Geer, 1773)
- The general range of Bombus pensylvanicus. (Dashed line indicates former range)

Synonyms
- Apis pensylvanica De Geer, 1773; Apis americanorum Fabricius, 1775; Apis antiguensis Fabricius, 1775; Apis nidulans Fabricius, 1793; Bombus pallidus Cresson, 1863; Bombus pennsylvanicus Cresson, 1863 (Emend.); Psithyrus cevalliae Cockerell, 1899; Bombus americana Howard, 1901 (Missp.); Bombus titusi Ashmead, 1902; Bombus pennsylvanicus v. umbratus Friese, 1931

= Bombus pensylvanicus =

Species of bee

Bombus pensylvanicus, the American bumblebee, is a threatened species of bumblebee native to North America. It occurs in eastern Canada, throughout much of the Eastern United States, and much of Mexico.

Once the most prevalent bumblebee in the southern United States, populations of Bombus pensylvanicus have decreased significantly in recent years, including in its scientific namesake state of Pennsylvania, where its numbers are considered critically low. Overall, the population dropped nearly 90% in just the first two decades of the 21st century.

Bombus pensylvanicus tends to live and nest in open farmland and fields. It feeds on several food plants, favoring sunflowers and clovers, and functions as a pollinator.

== Taxonomy and phylogenetics ==
Bombus pensylvanicus belongs to the order Hymenoptera (consisting of ants, wasps, bees, and sawflies), the family Apidae (consisting of cuckoo, digger, carpenter, bumble, and honeybees), the subfamily Apinae (consisting of honey, orchid, bumble, long-horned, and digger bees), and the genus Bombus (consisting of bumblebees). Within Bombus, B. pensylvanicus belongs to the subgenus Thoracobombus, which includes species such as Bombus armeniacus, Bombus pauloensis, Bombus dahlbomii, Bombus fervidus, Bombus humilis, Bombus morio, Bombus muscorum, Bombus pascuorum, Bombus pomorum, Bombus ruderarius, Bombus sylvarum, and Bombus transversalis. Bombus pensylvanicus is sometimes mistaken for B. terricola or B. auricomus, but its closest relative is Bombus sonorus Scientists sometimes treat Bombus sonorus as a subspecies of Bombus pensylvanicus, although each species maintain differences in male genitalia. Intermediate individuals of B. pensylvanicus and B. sonorus have been reported in areas of geographic overlap; however, they have since been shown to not hybridize over a broad area of geographic overlap, confirming the status of B. sonorus as a distinct species.

== Description and identification ==
Bombus pensylvanicus is a widespread species, characterized as long-tongued. In comparison to its closest relative, B. sonorus, B. pensylvanicus is a paler yellow and with a different pattern of yellow and black banding. Specially, B. pensylvanicus has yellow hairs on the pronotum and usually has a black scutellum, sometimes with yellow and black hairs mixed. Abdominal tergites T2 and T3 are yellow, as is the posterior portion of T1. The malar space is long and lanky. These characteristics resemble those of B. fervidus and B. auricomus, leading to confusion among species. In terms of characteristics within the hive, a larger queen measures 22–26 mm compared with a worker at 13–19 mm. Males have an outward penis valve head with a broad banana shape and often have extensive yellow on the thoracic dorsum posteriorly and beyond abdominal tergite T3

Whilst bees normally forage close to their nests, it has been observed that individuals can return from up to 1.5 miles away, though there is likely individual variation in homing ability and the time it takes a bee to find its way back to the nest. The method utilized by the bees is most likely trial and error, not a sixth sense or homing instinct, because the time taken to return to the nest varies. Males become more common in late summer.

== Distribution and habitat ==
Bombus pensylvanicus ranges from the Eastern Great Plains to eastern and central US and southern Canada, and Mexico. The species has become rarer, declining in number mainly in northern parts of its range. B. pensylvanicus generally nests in fields of long grass, but may sometimes nest underground. The species utilizes bundles of hay or long grass to create sheltered nests above ground. Some nest in established crevices and burrows, such as old bird nests, rodent burrows and cinder blocks. This species has even been noted to nest in human-made objects such as buckets and barns.

== Colony cycle ==
Bombus pensylvanicus maintains a reproductive cycle similar to other species of bumblebee. Environmental factors as well as accessibility of resources affects the cyclic advancement of the colony. The cycle begins in February and ends around November or December. Female bees can yield eggs without the need for mating, a process known as haplodiploidy. Unfertilized eggs develop into males, whereas fertilized eggs develop into female workers or queen bees. The reproductive cycle begins in July/August, when a male mates with a freshly hatched queen. The fertilized queen stays in hibernation until spring of the next year, waiting for the optimal conditions to search for a nest. In March, the queen bee gathers pollen and nectar, as a source of nutrition and to build a wax pot, and establishes her colony. These colonies most likely arrange and initiate in February. Female workers develop through the pollen collected as it stimulates the ovaries to create eggs, which are fertilized from the males of year before. The queen continues to warm the eggs initially, then the eggs continue their life cycle of development: first larval stage, then pupae, and lastly adult female workers. The female workers care for the nest and eggs, whereas the queen lays eggs. This process of egg to adult bee takes about 4–5 weeks. Initial workers forage and increase the colony size by bringing resources for growth. Thus, workers that hatch later in the year, around midsummer, tend to be larger than initial worker bees. The hives continue to grow, and in late summer there can be more than 200 worker bees. At the point when the size of the hive is sufficient, the queen stops production of a chemical that prevents ovarian production of certain females leading to specify the production of queen bee eggs and male eggs. Certain female workers may produce their own eggs, but the queen will usually get rid of them. The constant battle between the queen and workers continue until late summer when the workers sting the queen to death. The cycle begins again in the winter as the queen bee eggs hatch and the worker bees die.

=== Colony Hierarchy ===
B. pensylvanicus has a varying stability within its colony cycle. Queens are considered the dominant caste because they are usually the largest bees of the colony. As worker male bees grow larger in average wing length, they become the dominant caste as the number of queens decrease. Wing length of males vary depending upon the point of colony development. Initial males that found the colony tend to have a smaller wing length than the first or second generation of the colony. Food supply is scarce, at first, as the queen is the forager. Until July, the workers are the foraging caste and an enormous increase in body size is observed. The worker proportions decrease when reproductive males develop, representing a turning point in the colony, as male size increase until active bees develop to the size of a queen near November and December when the worker population dissipates. Queens maintain the least amount of standard deviation for average wing length and thus are the most stable caste in the colony. It is postulated that this is because queens are made in a short time span when colony resources have reached its threshold. The activity of B. pensylvanicus in a subtropical zone resemble that of species in temperate zones, maintaining periods where there are no active bees.

== Interaction with other species ==
=== Predators ===
Although Bombus pensylvanicus maintains aposematic coloration and defensive stinger, it faces many predators. Predation is likely to be caused by attack to gain the resources of the hive, which contains carbohydrate and protein abundant nectar, larvae, and pollen. Predators consist of mostly mammals such as skunks, bears, and raccoons. Furthermore, bumble bees are predated on by birds for food. Foragers are frequently predated by invertebrates. Crab spiders and cryptically colored ambush bugs ambush bees at flowers to catch them. Robber flies resemble bumble bees and clasp the bumble bees, insert them with enzymes, then eat their internal organs. Mallophora bomboides is a robber fly species that preys specifically on B. pensylvanicus and uses it as a model for Batesian mimicry. Wasps, such as the beewolf species Philanthus bicinctus, intercept bees then paralyze them with venom, using them to nourish the wasp’s larvae. Assassin bugs and dragonflies are also common predators of the bee.

=== Parasites ===
Bumble bees are generally host to a diversity of parasitoids in which the larvae grow inside the living host. The majority of parasitoids for bumble bees are flies and about 30 percent or more bees within the area can be infected. The process of parasitism consists of the fly attaching to the bee in flight and inserting her oviposits between the terga of the bee. The larval fly hatches within the bee host and develops by feeding on the host’s tissues. The bee lives for about two weeks before dying. The fly then pupates and spends the winter inside the bee, fully developed, before it emerges the following year. Bombus pensylvanicus is host to one "cuckoo" bumble bee species, B. variabilis. Hibernating queen bumble bees are parasitized by a nematode worm, Sphaerularia bombi. This parasite does not reduce life span, but instead causes the sterilization of the queen. It has been observed that affected queens forage two to three weeks later than those that are unaffected. Parasitic microorganisms also use bees as their host. Parasitic microorganisms’ effects may be lethal or sublethal. Pathogens may be transmitted within a colony or the bee may be infected at flowers. Tracheal mites (Locustacarus buchneri) leads to reduced foraging efficiency by living in the bee’s alveoli. Certain protozoans and fungi consume the host tissue or gut substances of the bumble bee’s digestive tract, decreasing foraging efficiency, life span, and thus the colony fitness. Bees may contain symbiotic bacteria that offer some immunity to pathogens. Further exposure to habitat loss as well as pesticide exposure may lead to bee predisposition, thus promoting the species’ decay.

=== Mimicry ===
Since bumble bees are characterized by a striking color pattern as well as a defensive sting, they are involved in mimetic complexes (both Müllerian mimicry and Batesian mimicry) with other insects that also gain reduced predation. Bombus pensylvanicus is mimicked by various sawflies, day-flying moths (e.g. Hemaris diffinis), beetles, flies, and other bees, such as carpenter and digger bees.

== Behavior ==
=== Pollinator preference ===
Wesselingh and Arnold (2000) studied pollinator preferences on Iris fulva (red-flowered) and Iris brevicaulis (blue-flowered). B. pensylvanicus preferred purple-flowered hybrids. The bees continued to visit the nearest flowers the majority of the time, demonstrating that movements were usually between a diversity of flower types rather than prioritizing only one type of flower. Thus a lack of intermediate genotypes of iris hybrids is not due to pollinator preference by B. pensylvanicus but rather pollinating behavior is done through mixed mating of alternating flower types of different pollination syndromes.

=== Resource partitioning ===
Johnson tested for intraspecific size resource utilization differences in B. pensylvanicus. In Minnesota, flowers with short corollas and long corollas existed in single and mixed species stands. Foragers with short corollas and shorter proboscises (tongue) were discovered in mixed species stands. Johnson concluded that B. pensylvanicus foragers would preference the corolla length that corresponds with their proboscis length. Further comparison of conspecific foragers of mixed versus single species stands revealed a shorter proboscis length for mixed species in comparison to single species stand for the short corolla. This study postulated that a diversity of flowering species may influence the specific bee that pollinates the species for single species stand.

== Gene flow and decline ==
Bumblebee species have been found to deteriorate substantially in 1940-1960, and continue to decrease presently. Ranges of Bombus pensylvanicus have specifically decreased in Illinois, coinciding with agricultural investment within the state. Lozier and Cameron evaluated genetic structure using microsatellite markers in Illinois to compare genetic variation of historical versus contemporary collections within B. pensylvanicus. It was found that B. pensylvanicus had greater population structure, indicating reduced gene flow and dispersal among populations. It was found that genetic diversity has overall not been significantly altered over time, but there were some reductions in B. pensylvanicus. Slight losses of genetic diversity in B. pensylvanicus may be an indication of the species’ decline. These results were expected because of the recent decrease in population, which would cause declines in genetic diversity for severe bottleneck situations. Thus, the alteration in gene flow may suggest potential future genetic differentiation of the B. pensylvanicus.

== Status ==
Current research states that Bombus pensylvanicus is uncommon and declining quickly. As stated in previous sections, the northern range of B. pensylvanicus has significantly decreased. Once the most abundant species throughout the southern United States, B. pensylvanicus is now a rare species that has been extirpated in certain areas and has suffered declines in others. Conservation efforts are encouraged in order to maintain the species, including in agriculture with wildlife-friendly techniques including hedgerows and pest management.
