= Sphaerularia vespae =

Scientific classification
- Domain: Eukaryota
- Kingdom: Animalia
- Phylum: Nematoda
- Class: Secernentea
- Order: Tylenchida
- Family: Sphaerulariidae
- Genus: Sphaerularia
- Species: S. vespae

Binomial name
- Sphaerularia vespae Kanzaki et al., 2007

Species of roundworm

Sphaerularia vespae is an endoparasitic nematode that infects the Japanese yellow hornet, Vespa simillima. It invades and resides in the gaster (abdomen) of female hornets where it grows and develops. Because S. vespae sterilizes its host, it is also known as a parasitic castrator. After S. bombi, it is the second recognized species of the genus Sphaerularia.

== Diagnosis ==
Sphaerularia vespae is characterized by the round, finger-like tip tail of females and the conspicuous male bursa. These features are used to distinguish S. vespae from S. bombi. In addition, the square head shape of parasitic juveniles also distinguishes S. vespae from S. bombi, which have a more round, dome-shaped head.

== Distribution ==
S. vespae has been found at several sites in Sapporo, Hokkaido, Japan (Hitsujigaoka, Mount Moiwa and Shiraikawa Sapporo), and in Nishi-Nopporo, Ebetsu, Hokkaido.

== Life cycle ==
S. vespae has a similar life cycle to that of S. bombi. Juveniles of S. vespae are passed out in the feces of the host and deposited in the soil. There, the juveniles grow and develop. Later, fertilized adult females infect healthy hornet queens that settle in the soil for hibernation. When these newly infected queens emerge from hibernation they are now carrying adult S. vespae in their abdomen. In the spring, these parasitized queens display behavior that is inappropriate to the time of the year. Normally, in the fall, healthy queen hornets visit various nooks and crannies, such as decayed logs in the forest, to find a spot to hibernate. When the queen finds a suitable site, she lines it with plant fibers that serve as nesting material. However, queen hornets that have been infected by S. vespae have become sterilized due to their undeveloped ovaries and start visiting decaying logs much earlier in the year, during early to mid-summer. Parasitized queen hornets never dig or gather nesting materials when they land at different locations. Instead, they fly from one potential hibernation site to another, each time dropping off a load of S. vespae juveniles. Once deposited in the soil, these juveniles wait for new hosts that settle in for hibernation in the fall and the cycle repeats itself.
