= Leschenault =

Leschenault may refer to:

- Jean-Baptiste Leschenault de La Tour (1773–1826), French botanist and ornithologist
- Leschenault, Western Australia, an outer suburb of Bunbury
- Leschenault Estuary, an estuarine lagoon to the north of Bunbury, Western Australia
- Leschenault, a former name of the Electoral district of Mitchell (Western Australia)

== See also ==
- Lechenaultia - genus of flowering plants
- Leschenault's leaf-toed gecko
- Leschenault's rousette - species of fruit bat
- Leschenaultia - genus of flies, with 32 identified species
- Mallophora leschenaulti - species of fly
