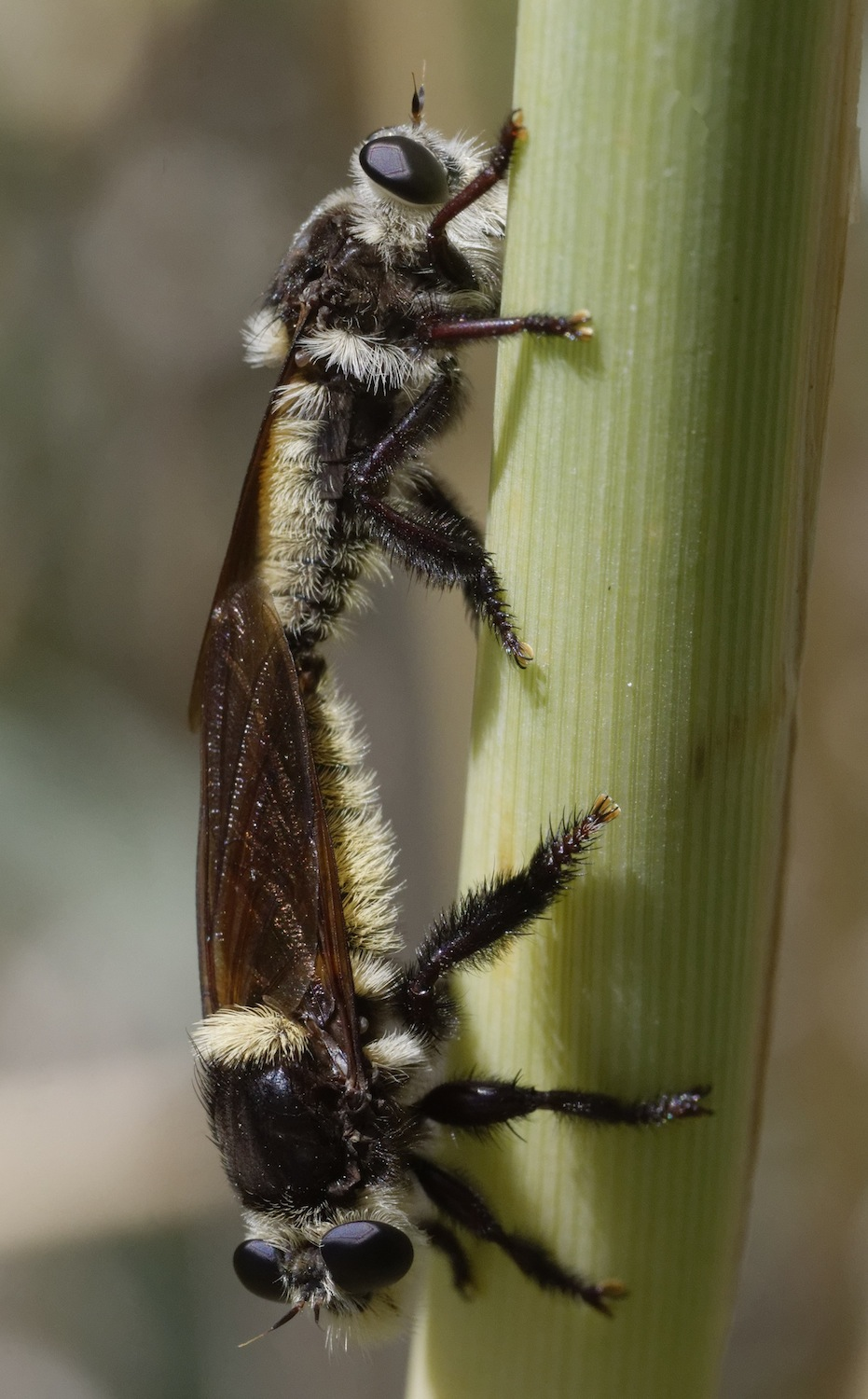

Scientific classification
- Kingdom: Animalia
- Phylum: Arthropoda
- Clade: Pancrustacea
- Class: Insecta
- Order: Diptera
- Family: Asilidae
- Genus: Mallophora
- Species: M. fautrix

Binomial name
- Mallophora fautrix Osten Sacken, 1887

= Mallophora fautrix =

Species of fly

Mallophora fautrix is a species of robber fly in the family Asilidae, commonly known as the golden-tailed bee bandit or bee killer robber fly.

== Description ==
An adult M. fautrix is typically in the range of 15–20 mm (0.59–0.79 in) long, with brown wings and a black thorax. The body is otherwise covered with hairs in a pattern of black, white, and yellow that resembles workers of the bumble bee species Bombus sonorus. Male and female adults are similar in appearance.

== Taxonomy ==
Carl Robert Osten-Sacken formally described M. fautrix in 1887, selecting for it a species epithet that is Latin for "patroness or protector."

== Distribution ==
M. fautrix is found in Mexico and the southwestern United States. It is the only member of genus Mallophora found in California.

== Behavior ==
The bee killer robber fly perches in wait for the approach of a suitable prey insect. It eats honey bees, wasps, and other arthropods of similar size.

Eggs of M. fautrix are laid in the ground.
