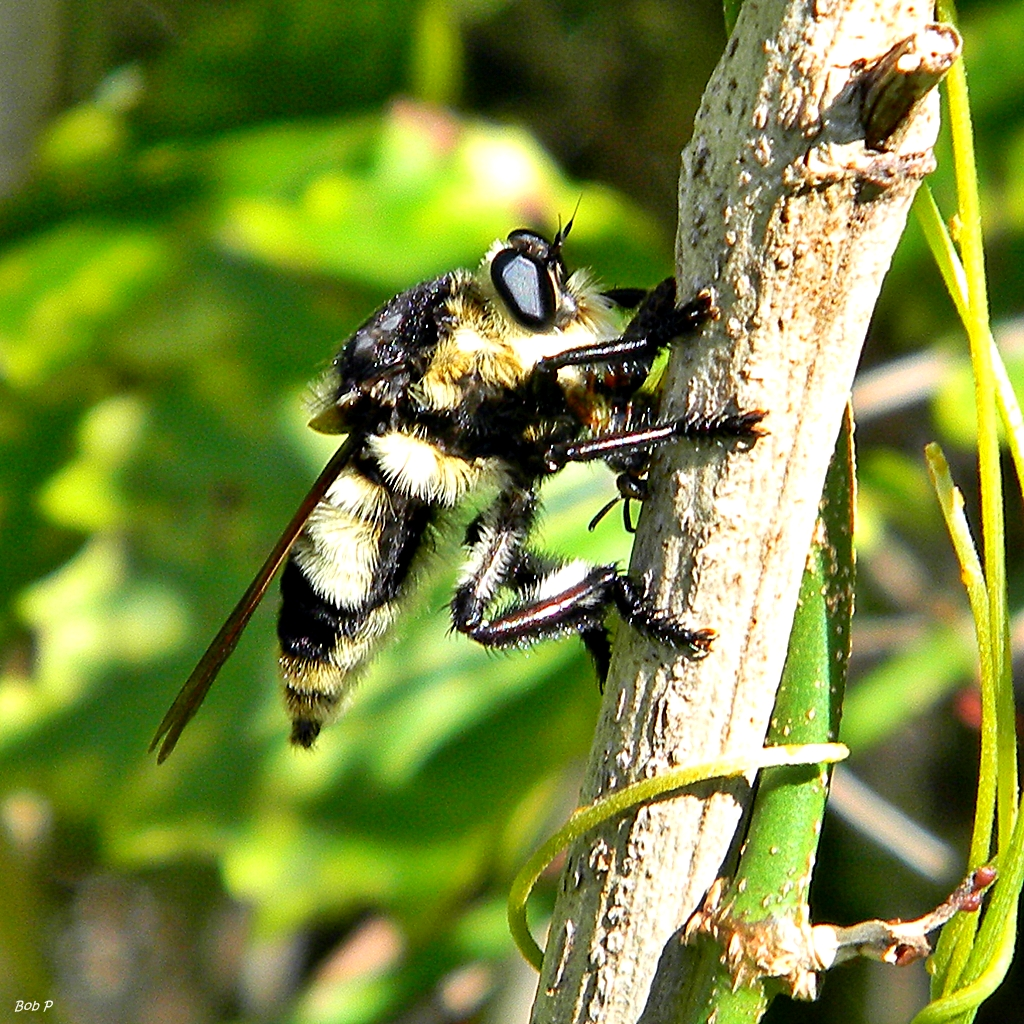
- Mallophora bomboides

Scientific classification
- Kingdom: Animalia
- Phylum: Arthropoda
- Class: Insecta
- Order: Diptera
- Family: Asilidae
- Subfamily: Asilinae
- Genus: Mallophora

= Mallophora =

Genus of flies

Mallophora is a genus of bee killers in the family Asilidae. There are about 60 described species in Mallophora.

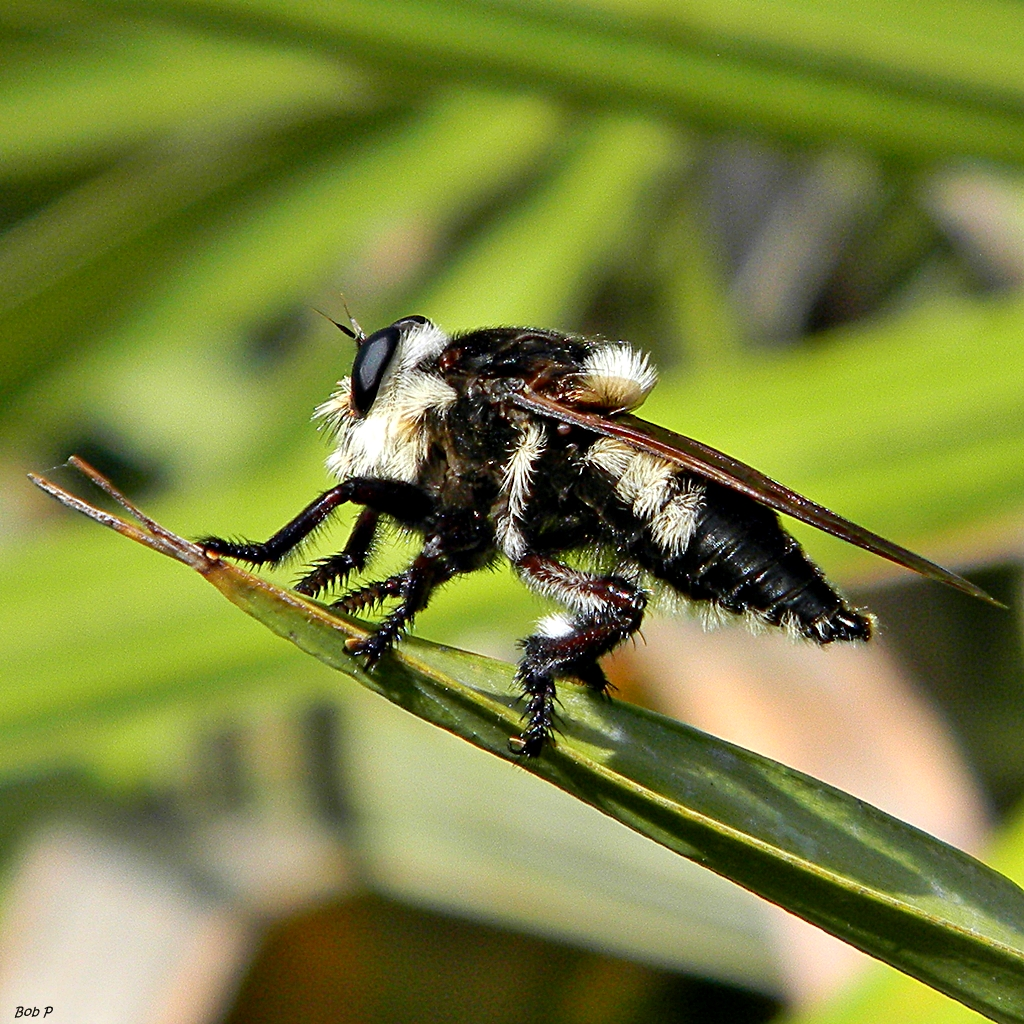
Mallophora orcina

== Selected species ==
- Mallophora ardens Macquart, 1834
- Mallophora atra Macquart, 1834 (black bee killer)
- Mallophora bomboides (Wiedemann, 1821) (Florida bee killer)
- Mallophora fautrix Osten Sacken, 1887
- Mallophora fulviventris Macquart, 1850
- Mallophora leschenaulti Macquart, 1838 (belzebul bee-eater)
- Mallophora orcina (Wiedemann, 1828) (southern bee killer)
- Mallophora thompsoni Artigas and Angulo, 1980
- Mallophora ruficauda Wiedemann, 1828
