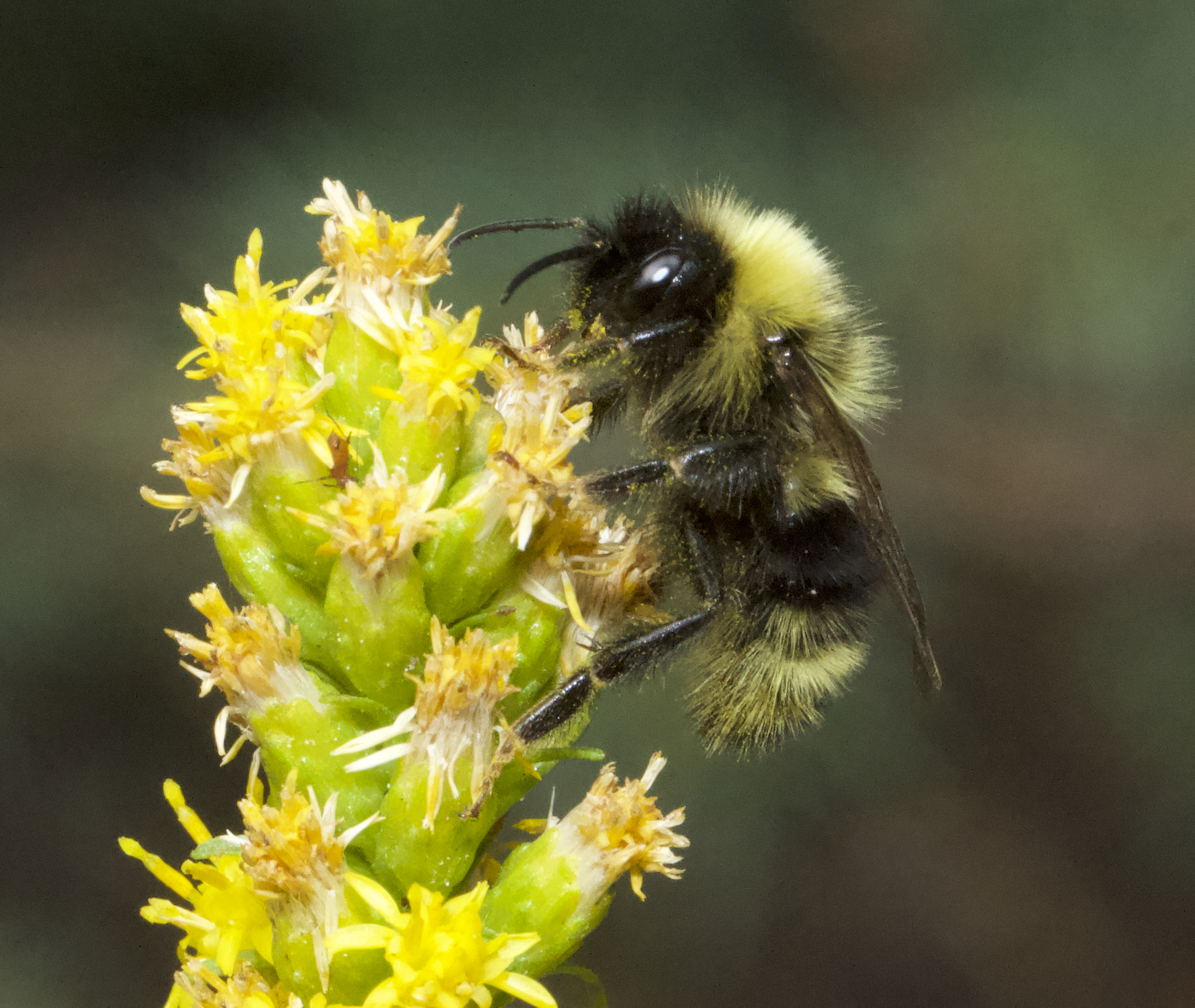
- Jasper, Alberta, 2022

Scientific classification
- Domain: Eukaryota
- Kingdom: Animalia
- Phylum: Arthropoda
- Class: Insecta
- Order: Hymenoptera
- Family: Apidae
- Genus: Bombus
- Subgenus: Psithyrus
- Species: B. ashtoni

Binomial name
- Bombus ashtoni (Cresson, 1864)

= Bombus ashtoni =

Species of bee

Bombus ashtoni is a species of cuckoo bumblebee. This means that it parasitizes closely related species such as Bombus affinis, Bombus terricola, and Bombus fervidus by residing in the nests of these bumblebees and tricking the bees into providing resources such as food for them.
