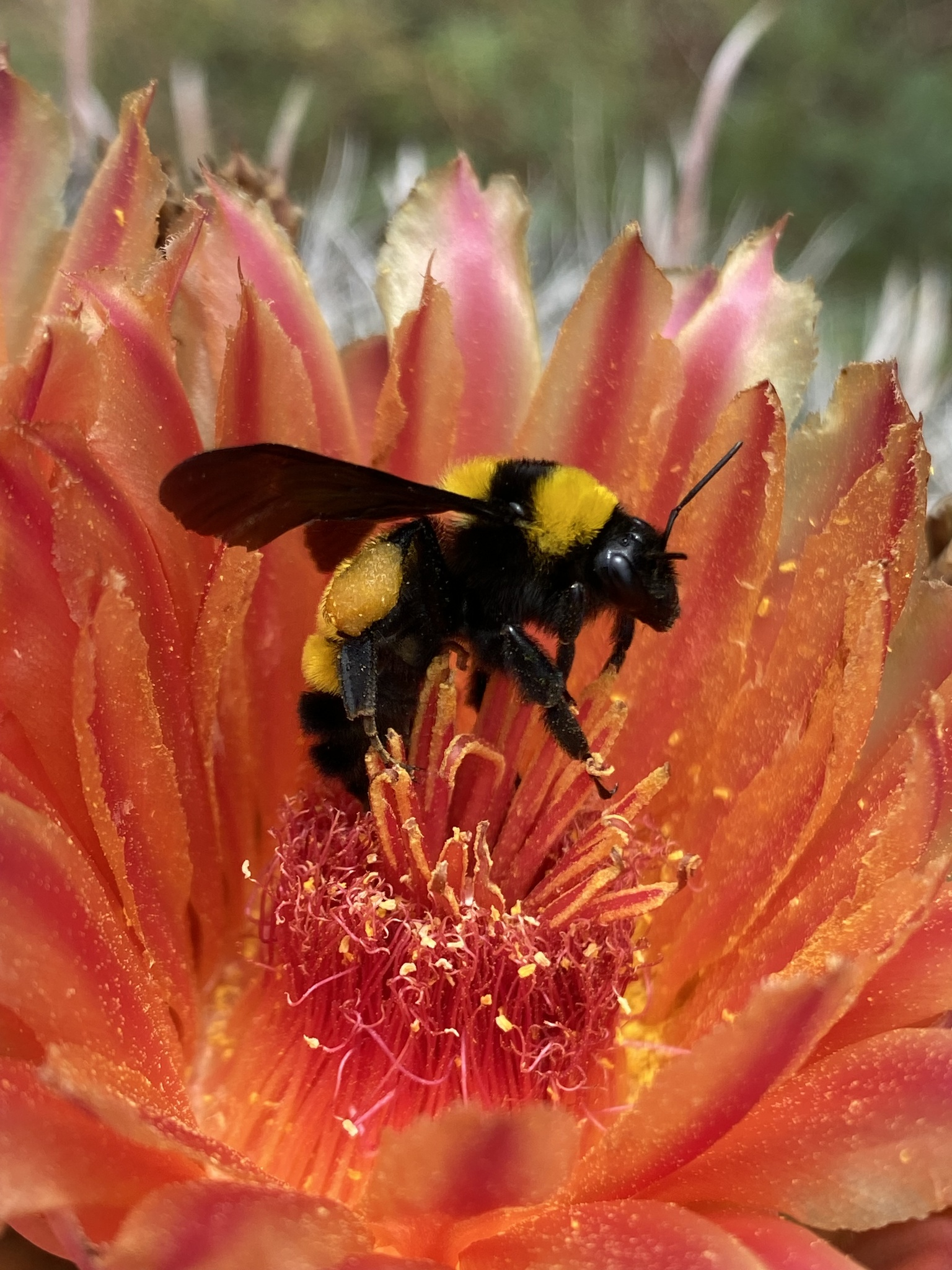

Scientific classification
- Kingdom: Animalia
- Phylum: Arthropoda
- Clade: Pancrustacea
- Class: Insecta
- Order: Hymenoptera
- Family: Apidae
- Tribe: Bombini
- Genus: Bombus
- Species: B. sonorus

Binomial name
- Bombus sonorus Say, 1837

= Bombus sonorus =

Species of bee

Bombus sonorus, commonly known as the Sonoran bumble bee, is a species of bumble bee in the family Apidae. It is found in Mexico and southwestern North America. Although it has often been categorized as a subspecies of Bombus pensylvanicus, it has since been shown to not hybridize with B. pensylvanicus over a broad area of geographic overlap, confirming its status as a distinct species.

== Description ==
Female B. sonorus is recognized by having the thoracic hairs yellow on the pronotum, anterior portion of scutum, and scutellum resulting in a black band between the base of the wings. Additionally, the first three abdominal segments (T1-T3) are entirely yellow. Males are similar, but have T1-T4 yellow. The shade of yellow is deep golden color. It can be confused with the yellow form of Bombus crotchii and with Bombus nevadensis. It is known to collect pollen from Gossypium, Viguiera, Helianthus, Linaria, Chrysothamnus, and Kallstroemia flowers. These bumblebees generally nest underground, often in old pocket gopher burrows.

== Etymology and name ==
The genus name Bombus is Latin for a buzzing sound. The specific name sonorus translates literally from Latin as noisy, loud, resounding, sonorous (sonorous is an English word that means loud and resounding, which makes sense given that it is a large bee that makes a loud buzzing sound when flying). However, the common name has always been the Sonoran bumble bee--likely due to an incorrect translation of sonorus and propagation of that error (if the species name had intended to refer to the Mexican state of Sonora, it would have been sonorensis).

== Distribution, systematics, and conservation status ==
B. sonorus occurs from California to central Texas and south to southern Mexico. It is most closely related to B. pensylvanicus with which it overlaps in the western half of Texas and parts of New Mexico and Mexico. It is a member of the subgenus Thoracobombus. B. pensylvanicus sensu lato (which includes B. sonorus) is under review for federal protection under the Endangered Species Act and is listed as Vulnerable on the IUCN Red List.
