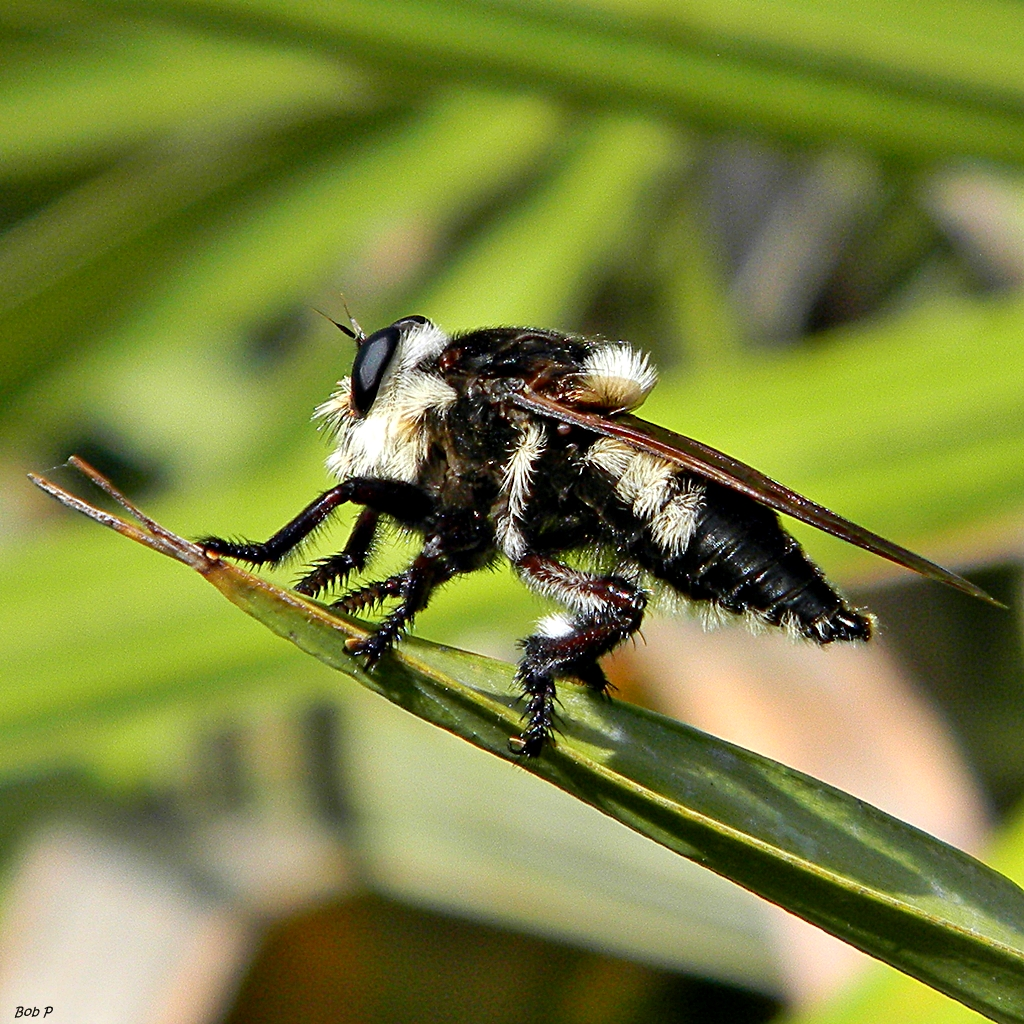

Scientific classification
- Domain: Eukaryota
- Kingdom: Animalia
- Phylum: Arthropoda
- Class: Insecta
- Order: Diptera
- Family: Asilidae
- Genus: Mallophora
- Species: M. orcina

Binomial name
- Mallophora orcina (Wiedemann, 1828)

Synonyms
- Asilus orcinus Wiedemann, 1828; Mallophora fulva Banks, 1911

= Mallophora orcina =

Species of fly

Mallophora orcina, the southern bee killer, is a species of robber flies in the family Asilidae.
