= Sphaerularia =

Scientific classification
- Domain: Eukaryota
- Kingdom: Animalia
- Phylum: Nematoda
- Class: Secernentea
- Order: Tylenchida
- Family: Sphaerulariidae
- Genus: Sphaerularia; Dufour, 1837

Genus of roundworms

Sphaerularia is a genus of nematodes belonging to the family Sphaerulariidae.

The species of this genus are found in Europe and Northern America.

Species:

- Sphaerularia bombi Dufour, 1837
- Sphaerularia vespae Kanzaki, Kosaka, Sayama, Takahashi & Makino, 2007
