= Mallophora atra =

Scientific classification
- Domain: Eukaryota
- Kingdom: Animalia
- Phylum: Arthropoda
- Class: Insecta
- Order: Diptera
- Family: Asilidae
- Genus: Mallophora
- Species: M. atra

Binomial name
- Mallophora atra Macquart, 1834

Synonyms
- Mallophora nigra Williston, 1885

Species of fly

Mallophora atra, the black bee killer, is a species of robber flies in the family Asilidae.
