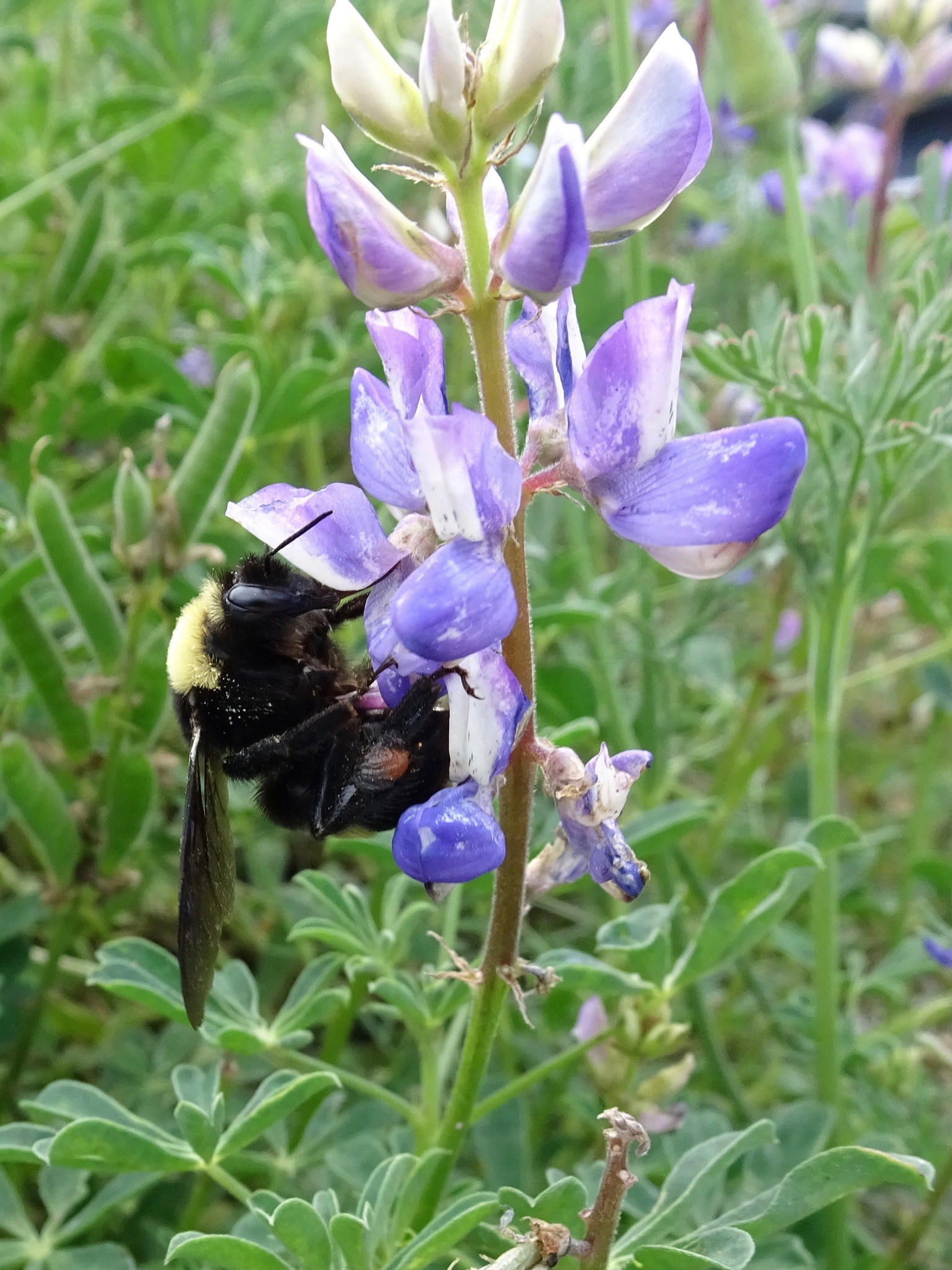
- female on lupine
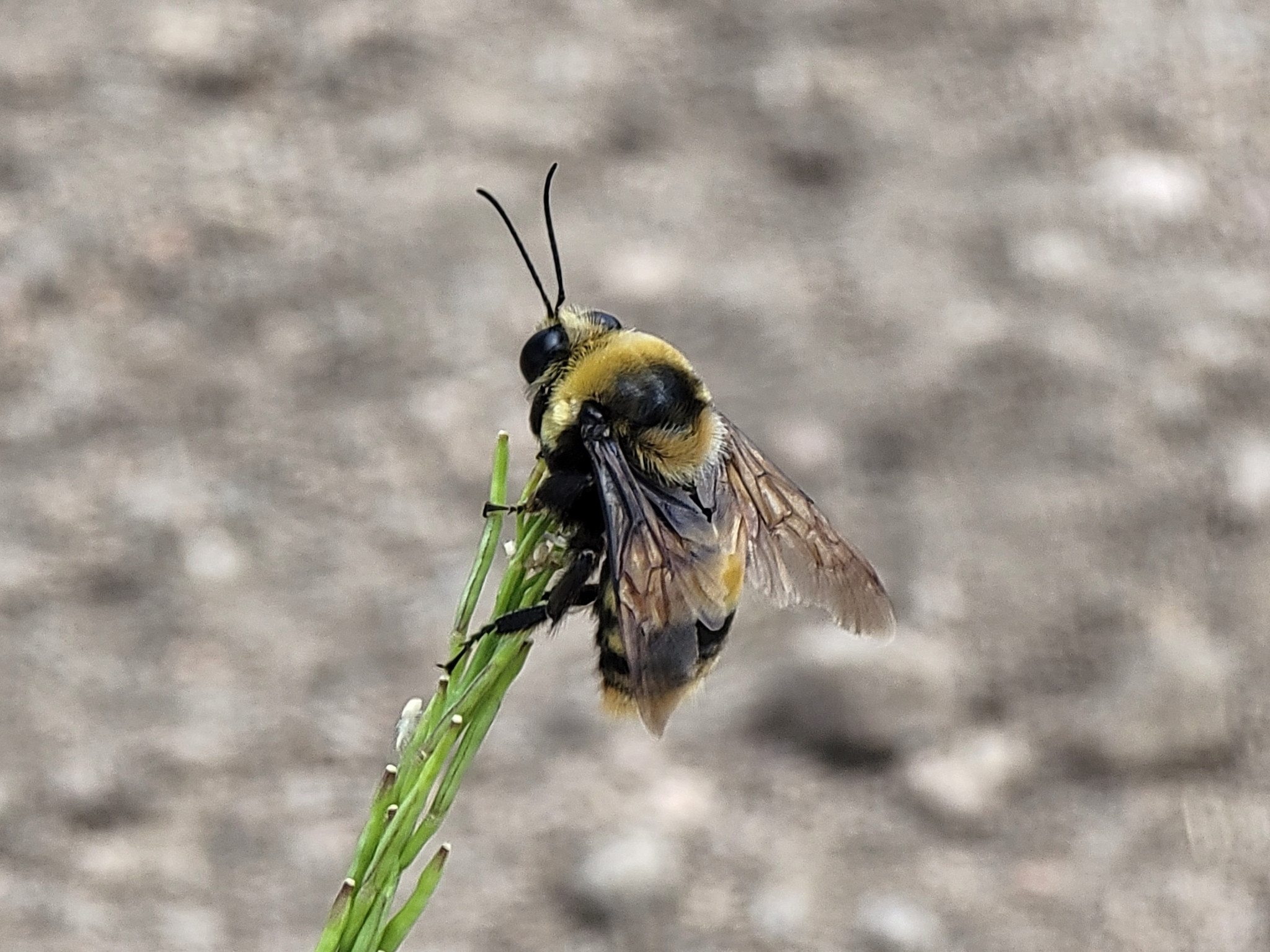
- Male, Quartz Hill, California

Conservation status
- Endangered (IUCN 3.1)

Scientific classification
- Kingdom: Animalia
- Phylum: Arthropoda
- Class: Insecta
- Order: Hymenoptera
- Family: Apidae
- Genus: Bombus
- Subgenus: Cullumanobombus
- Species: B. crotchii

Binomial name
- Bombus crotchii Cresson, 1878

Synonyms
- Bombus nigrocinctus Provancher, 1888; Bombus crotchii var. nigricaudus Frison, 1927

= Bombus crotchii =

Crotch's bumble bee

North American bee species

Bombus crotchii, commonly called Crotch's bumble bee or the Golden State bumble bee, is a species of bumblebee named after the entomologist George Robert Crotch. It is classified as endangered due to the impacts of pesticides, climate change, and human development.

== Description ==
Crotch's bumble bee is characterized as a short- or medium- tongue length species. This species could be confused with Bombus californicus or Bombus occidentalis, as they have color patterns similar to Crotch's bumble bee.

Queens and workers (females) have a black head and thorax, with yellow on the dorsal anterior thorax, and sometimes yellow on the scutellum. The first metasomal tergum (T1) of the abdomen is all black or black in the middle portion. T2 is usually yellow, sometimes black medially. T3-5 are black or orange and T6 is black. Queens and workers have a similar appearance, with the main difference being their body size. Queens are 23–24mm long and workers are 14–18mm long.

Males have a slightly different appearance from queens and workers. Their eyes are very large, occupying much of the face. They display yellow hair on their faces, and a broad black stripe mid thorax. The front of the male abdomen is yellow, and the rest of their abdomen is predominantly black and reddish yellow.

== Seasonality ==
B. crotchii males are generally present from May to September with their peak occurring in July. Workers of this species are active from April to August and queen bees are active for only two months from March until May; the peak of worker activity is between May and June, while queens reach maximum activity in April.

== Habitat ==
This species lives primarily in California in the United States. Crotch's bumble bee is extant but uncommon in Baja California, Mexico, and into Nevada. However, most observations of this species occur in southern California in coastal areas. The overwintering habitat of this bumblebee is not known, but it is believed that they have similar behaviors to other bumblebees in this respect, overwintering under leaf litter or soft soil.

Crotch's bumble bee inhabits grassland and scrub areas, requiring a hotter and drier environment than other bumble bee species, and can only tolerate a very narrow range of climatic conditions. Crotch's bumble bee nests underground, often in abandoned rodent dens. It is a nonmigratory species of bumble bee.

== Diet ==
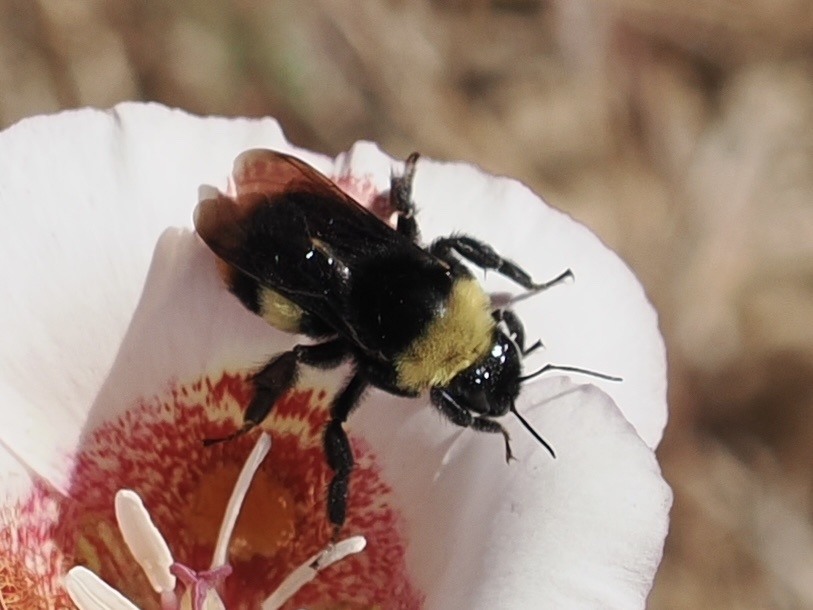
female on Calochortus

Its food plants include milkweeds, dustymaidens, lupines, medics, phacelias, and sages. It also feeds on snapdragons, Clarkia, poppies, and wild buckwheats. Milkweed is a favorite nectar source of Crotch's bumblebee. Due to the role of bumble bees as pollinators, monarch butterflies benefit from this situation. Due to the wide range of host plants visited by Crotch's bumble bee, it is characterized as a dietary generalist.

== Conservation ==
Crotch's bumble bee is a state endangered species that was last evaluated by IUCN in April 2014. In 2019, the species' global status was listed as imperiled. The rationale provided was as follows: "This species has a modest range extent and within that, it is restricted to a very limited climatic range. Observations since 2008 indicate a retraction from the northern portion of its range. Relative abundance has also declined".

Its current range area is estimated at 144,003 km^{2}. This bumble bee was once common in the Central Valley of California, but is now scarce in that area. The Xerces Society (2019) reports a relative abundance decline of 98% over the last decade; the group has also estimated an 80% decline in the relative persistence of the bumble bee in its range during this time. Regions within the Crotch's bumble bee range have experienced urbanization and intensive agriculture, events that are thought to have contributed to the decline of the species. Another prominent issue for this bumble bee species is that of climate change; as stated above, this species is a major climatic specialist compared to other bumble bees, so climate change and increasing aridity are significant threats to Crotch's bumble bee. Additionally, insecticides are problematic for the health of B. crotchii, especially neonicotinoids, which are very commonly applied. Moreover, the toxicity to bumble bees from these types of pesticides lasts for several months, meaning the negative impacts can be observed over the long-term. Inbreeding is probably also becoming problematic, especially as B. crotchii populations continue to decline.

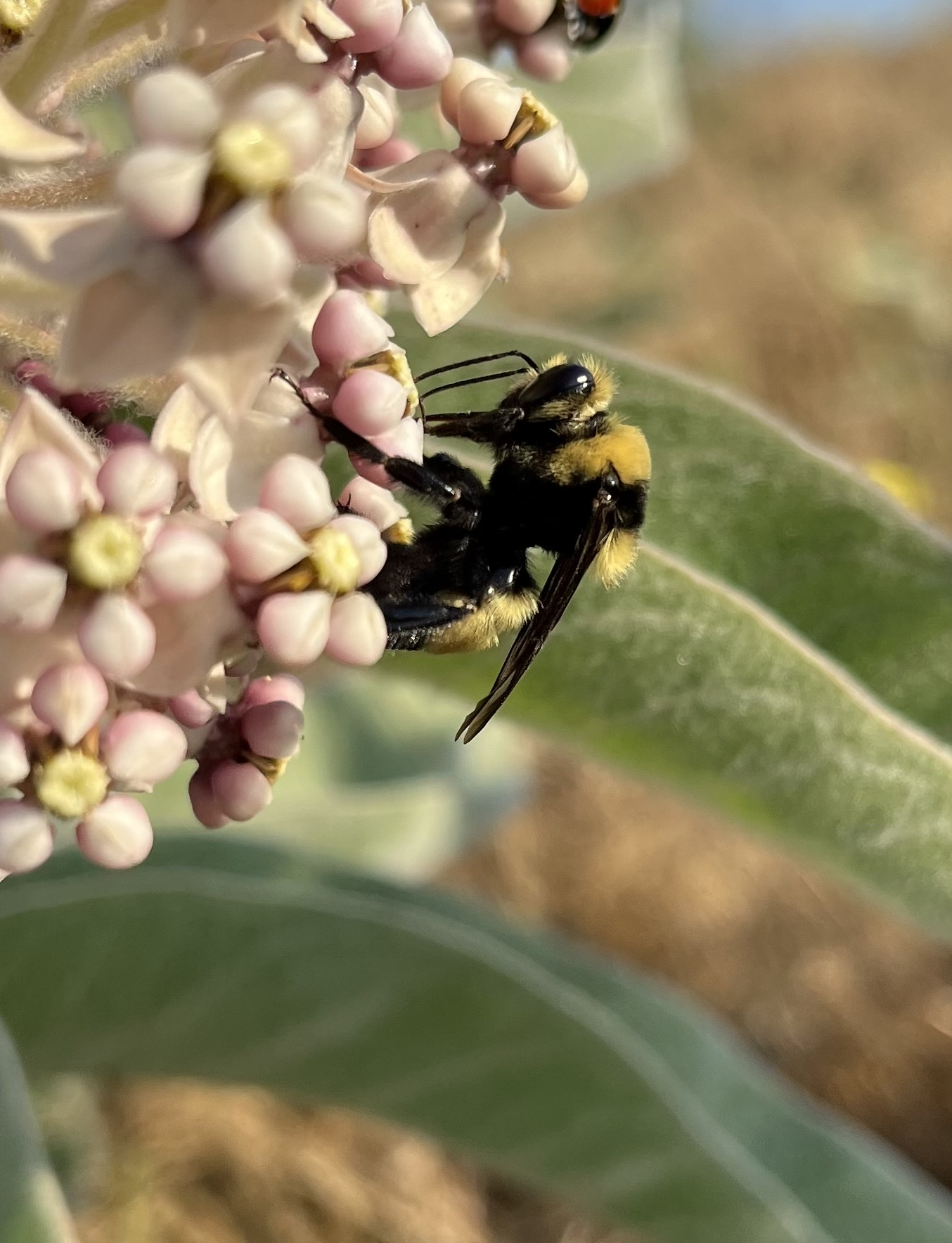
male on milkweed

A petition was submitted by the Xerces society, Defenders of Wildlife, and the Center for Food Safety to the California Fish and Game Commission in October 2018 to list Crotch's bumble bee and three others as endangered under the California Endangered Species Act. The petition provides probably the most up to date figures on the status of Crotch's bumble bee: "Current range size relative to historic range (EOO): 74.67% (25.33% decline), persistence in current range relative to historic occupancy: 20.48% (79.52% decline), current relative abundance compared to historic relative abundance: 2.32% (97.68% decline), average decline: 67.51%".

The California Department of Fish and Wildlife evaluated this petition in a report for The California Fish and Game Commission completed in April 2019. In regard to Crotch's bumble bee, the report states that: "In completing its Petition Evaluation, the Department has determined the Petition provides sufficient scientific information to indicate the petitioned action may be warranted. Therefore, the Department recommends the Commission accept the Petition for further consideration under CESA".

On June 12, 2019 the California Fish and Game Commission voted to add the four bumble bees, including Crotch's bumble bee, as Candidate Endangered species under the California Endangered Species Act. A subsequent legal challenge of the CESA's definition of a fish as "a wild fish, mollusk, crustacean, invertebrate, amphibian, or part, spawn, or ovum of any of those animals" was eventually overruled, because the explicit intent was for all invertebrates (therefore including insects) to be qualified for protection under this legal definition. This is an important step because there are no other formal protections in place for Crotch's bumblebee despite its decline.
