= Mallophora ruficauda =

Scientific classification
- Kingdom: Animalia
- Phylum: Arthropoda
- Clade: Pancrustacea
- Class: Insecta
- Order: Diptera
- Family: Asilidae
- Genus: Mallophora
- Species: M. ruficauda

Binomial name
- Mallophora ruficauda Wied., 1828

Species of parasitic robber fly

Mallophora ruficauda is a species of parasitic robber fly in the family Asilidae, endemic to South and Central America. Like other robber flies, M. ruficauda is known for its aggressive behavior and predation upon other insects, especially bees. M. ruficauda (like other members of the genus Mallophora) mimics a bumblebee to fool predators into thinking it has a painful sting and is not worth eating.

M. ruficauda larvae parasitize scarab beetles and likely serve as an important biocontrol for the beetles, a pest species that eats the roots and tubers of plants while in the larval stage. On the other hand, adult M. ruficauda are apicultural pests because they feed on worker honeybees.

== Description ==
M. ruficauda is a bumblebee mimic, meaning it appears very similar to a bumblebee despite actually being a fly. It is large and covered in dense black hair (setae) with a patch of yellow on the thorax, and has a pointed black abdomen with a spot of reddish hair at the tip. The wings are smoky brown and generate a buzzing sound during flight, similar to the wings of bees. The head is black and the face is covered in white hairs, which are also found on the ventral side of the femora, tibia, and tarsale of the third pair of legs in males. The third pair of legs is stronger and lengthened compared to the other two smaller pairs.

Larvae are minute, measuring only 1.35 mm in length and 0.32 mm in width on average. Their small size allows them to easily disperse by wind after hatching.

M. ruficauda is endemic to South and Central America, and is primarily present in the open grasslands and meadows where it lays its eggs. The flies are most active during the day, especially during sunny and hot days in the summer (December-May in the Southern Hemisphere).

=== Sensory physiology ===
Researchers have shown that M. ruficauda antennae are involved in resource-searching behavior, in addition to detecting outside chemical cues that the flies are able to pick up on. Their antennae are composed of four different segments: the scape, pedicel, postpedicel, and style. In addition, there are three separate types of sensory pits observed on the antennae. Together, these morphological characteristics contribute to the odor detection mechanism found in adult M. ruficauda, which may be used in mate detection, habitat recognition, predator avoidance, and searching for food.

== Life history ==
=== Larval stage ===
Eggs are laid in aggregate clusters of approximately 300 on the tips of tall stalks of grass or wire fencing. Oviposition occurs at the optimal height for larval dispersal and location of hosts, which is about 1.25 to 1.5 meters above the ground. These clusters are typically near adult food sources, such as beehives. Upon hatching, the tiny larvae drift to the ground, dispersing under wind power. This helps them spread out so that they do not all encounter and parasitize the same host, which would cause competition for resources between the larvae. The larvae then begin to dig in an attempt to find a host (preferably a larval Cyclocephala signaticollis, a type of scarab beetle, though the larvae are not strict specialists and will parasitize several species of white grub), which will be located by the chemical cues provided by its own abdominal excretions. The larvae take 7 days to molt in the soil and enter the second instar, at which point they can detect and orientate towards the chemical cues produced by the grubs, and they dig through the soil towards prospective hosts. Upon finding a host, the larvae attach to the cuticle and begin to feed. The larvae stay attached to their hosts for the rest of the larval stage, eventually killing the host upon pupation. Larvae can survive through the second instar on their own, but if they do not find a host before the second instar ends, they will die.

==== Larval superparasitism ====
Superparasitism is common among the larvae of M. ruficauda, with many larvae sometimes infecting a single host. They prefer unparasitized hosts if they can find them in order to avoid competing with members of their own species. However, the hosts are randomly distributed in the soil and the larvae may all have to share a host if only one is available. The larvae can discriminate between unparasitized and already-parasitized hosts by chemical cues, and will preferentially crawl towards unparasitized grubs. As the size of a host increases, the likelihood and severity of superparasitism also increases (presumably because a larger host is capable of supporting more parasites). These findings are one of the first reports of host discrimination by larvae rather than by adults. It makes sense that a Dipteran species would evolve this ability, since Dipteran parasitoids rarely have a strong enough ovipositor to lay eggs directly in a host. This eliminates the ability of the mother to choose a good host for her offspring; instead, the larvae have to find a host for themselves once they hatch. Therefore, they should be able to determine host quality. However, they are unable to detect free-living individuals of their own species, suggesting that they do not have significant interactions with them beyond competition for hosts.

==== Host defense ====
Researchers have explored many mechanisms that protect different hosts from the parasitic behavior of M. ruficauda. Hosts seem to display defense mechanisms both before and after parasitism. In certain cases, the hosts can escape M. ruficauda parasitism some weeks after the original attack. Violent body movements and torsion away from the parasite seem to be some of the most effective behavioral responses that allow for evasion of M. ruficauda. In addition, some studies have suggested that high environmental temperatures increase the probability that the host will successfully kill its parasitoid. M. ruficauda may prefer Cyclocephala in particular because these beetles have a relatively low behavioral reaction to simulated parasitoid attacks; their poor immunological defense strategies make them an easier target for the larvae.

=== Adult life ===
Upon pupating, the larva kills its host grub. The adult fly leaves the pupa and emerges from the soil about 2 months after the eggs first hatched, and begins to prey upon bees and other insects.

== Food resources ==
Larvae exclusively feed on their white grub hosts until they pupate and emerge as full-grown adults. The adults are predatory, feeding on insects (primarily Hymenoptera but also other insects, including other members of Diptera) endemic to the meadows that they inhabit.

== Mating ==
During the mating season, females spend most of their time resting on twigs, while males patrol fixed routes in search of mates. If a male fly finds a female, the male initiates a long courtship dance. The male positions itself perpendicular to the female, then rotates the third pair of legs in order to position them upwards and posteriorly. The male fly will then rhythmically twitch the third legs in bursts, alternating with periods of hovering. If the male touches the female's wings during this display, the female responds by rapidly scissoring them back and forth. This courtship takes approximately 30–40 minutes, after which copulation finally occurs (unless the female flees at any point during the dance, in which case the courtship fails). Alternatively, another male may intervene to compete for the female's attention, which may result in a fight between the two males. The female's signal to the male that she accepts him is subtle and still not understood; unless she flies away, she remains motionless throughout most of the courtship other than the occasional movements of her wings.

== Parental care ==
Host grubs are hidden in the soil, so mother flies cannot predict where they will be and lay her eggs in exactly the right spot. Instead, gravid flies lay their eggs at the optimal height on tall plants or wire fences in their meadow habitats. At around 1.25 to 1.5 meters off the ground, the larvae will gain the greatest benefit from the wind helping them to disperse. This results in the maximum number of offspring finding a host, with the minimum number of offspring being forced to share a host.

== Mimicry ==
Like several other species in the genus Mallophora, M. ruficauda is a bumblebee mimic, possibly as a result of Batesian mimicry, a type of mimicry in which a palatable or edible organism (such as the fly, which cannot sting) imitates an unpalatable organism (such as a bumblebee with a painful sting). This prevents predation, as predators will interpret the fly as an inedible bee and will not attempt to eat it. The flies are large and plump, covered in black and yellow fuzzy hair, and buzz like bees do during flight.

== Importance to humans ==
M. ruficauda is an important agricultural pest, particularly in the Pampas region of Argentina where honey is farmed. The adults kill and eat honeybees as one of their primary food sources, causing losses for farmers. Members of the genus Mallophora across the Americas cause problems for beekeepers by killing their honeybees, which have become one of their preferred foods even though these bees are not native to the region. During years when the density of M. ruficauda is high, they can cause up to 80% losses of honey production in regions where they are endemic.
