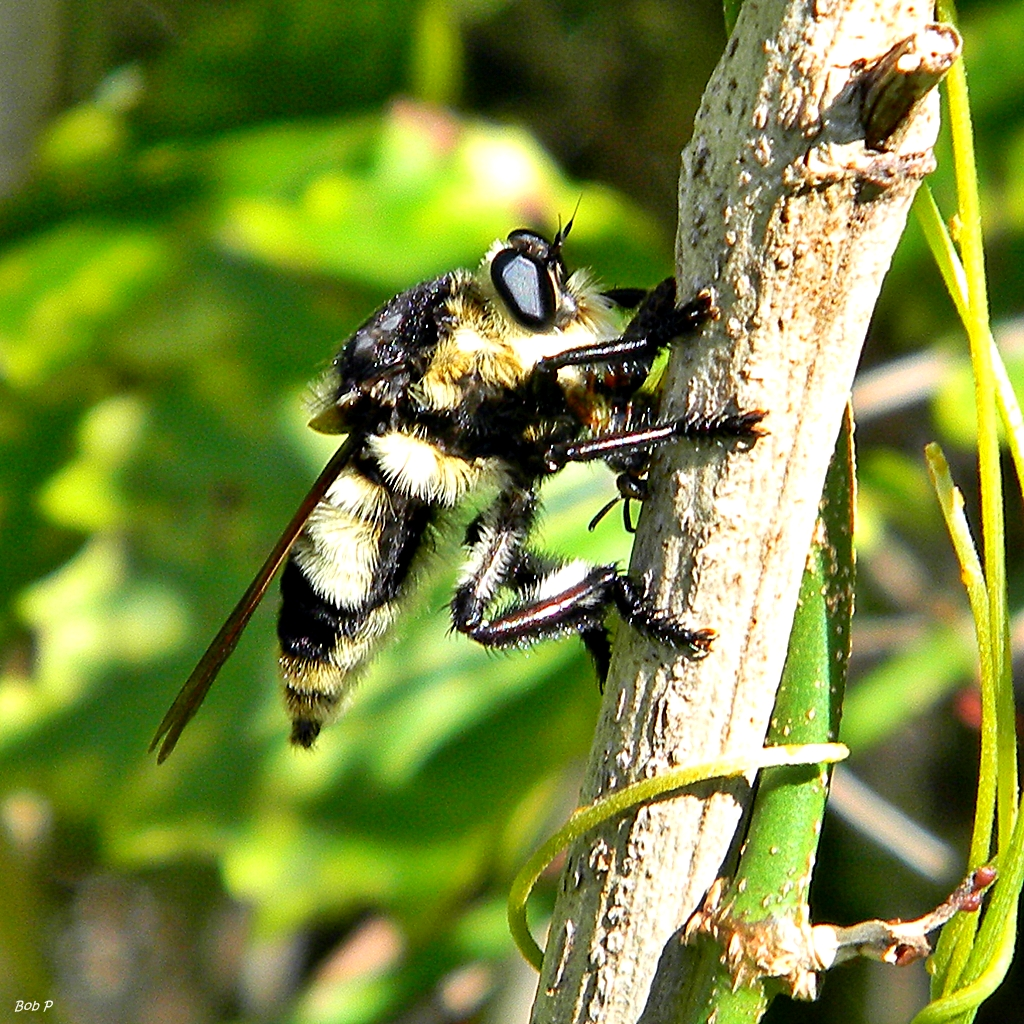

Scientific classification
- Kingdom: Animalia
- Phylum: Arthropoda
- Class: Insecta
- Order: Diptera
- Family: Asilidae
- Genus: Mallophora
- Species: M. bomboides

Binomial name
- Mallophora bomboides (Wiedemann, 1821)

Synonyms
- Asilus bomboides Wiedemann, 1821; Mallophora chrysomela Bromley, 1925; Mallophora rex Bromley, 1925

= Mallophora bomboides =

Species of fly

Mallophora bomboides, also known as the Florida bee killer, is a predaceous species of robber fly of the family Asilidae that feeds primarily on bumblebees. M. bomboides is a noteworthy instance of Batesian mimicry given its close resemblance to its prey, the bumblebee. These bees are typically found in the Eastern and Southern regions of the United States like South Carolina and Florida.

== Physical description ==
M. bomboides typically have three basal abdominal tergites densely covered with yellow hairs. The fourth and fifth tergites have black hairs, and the final two segments have pale hairs. The ventrum of the abdomen is adorned with yellow hairs. The average body length of M. bomboides is about 25 mm.

== Distribution ==
=== Geographical distribution ===
M. bomboides occurs in the southeastern United States in states including North Carolina, South Carolina, Georgia, Florida, Alabama, and Mississippi.

=== Phenology ===
Flight time in Florida is from April through December, though they are most commonly seen in late summer.

=== Habitat ===
Adults typically live in open habitats often in the vicinity of apiaries, perching on stalks of weeds or tips of shrubs from which they launch their attacks.

== Life cycle ==
=== Larva ===
Specific feeding habits of larvae of M. bomboides are unknown, but other Mallophora larvae are ectoparasites on scarabaeid beetle larvae in the soil.

=== Adult ===
Adults live in open habitats near apiaries. They perch vertically angled on plants from which they launch their attacks on their bumblebee prey.

== Mimicry ==
=== History ===
The similar appearances of some flies and bees have been noted since the time of Aristotle. In fact, in these ancient times, the confusion between the two insects led to the disproven notion that bees undergo spontaneous generation from decaying carcasses. British entomologists William Kirby and William Spence first theorized in 1817 that flies gained an advantage by resembling bees, reasoning that the physical similarity of hoverflies from genus Volucella to bumblebees enabled the invasion of bee nests. Having entered the bee nests without arousing suspicion, the flies then lay eggs and depart without being attacked. The same idea was later put forth by British naturalist Alfred Russel Wallace in 1871.

==== Initial classification ====
Classifying categories of mimicry in 1890, Edward Bagnell Poulton placed this into the category of aggressive mimicry, a deceptive mechanism in which one species resembles another in order to approach it without arousing suspicion to carry out a detrimental end. However, Gregory Bateson criticized this view in 1892 by pointing out that the Volucella example fits much better as an instance of protective mimicry, now commonly known as Batesian mimicry. By appearing as bees, palatable flies gain protection from predators that recognize bees as noxious and therefore unappetizing. Bateson argued with the counterexamples that Volucella females entered bumblebee nests belonging to species that they did not mimic and that a European species with similar habits actually benefited the host because the fly larvae, once hatched, acted as scavengers inside the nest.

===== Reclassification =====
In the same paper in which he discussed aggressive mimicry in order to account for Volucella appearances, Poulton also discussed family Asilidae flies that prey upon aculeate Hymenoptera as adults. M. bomboides bear a highly specific resemblance to their prey, which Poulton classified as protective mimicry. However, Lincoln Brower et al. demonstrated in 1960 that this phenomenon was, in fact, Batesian mimicry.

=== Aggressive mimicry ===
Adult M. bomboides prey on bumblebees, their mimetic models, to a great extent. Though their attacks are swift, it is possible that the resemblance of the fly to the prey and mode enhances the likelihood of its success. The same argument for aggressive mimicry in Volucella flies could apply in M. bomboides. Consistent with other members of the family Asilidae, larvae are thought to be predaceous, feeding on soft-bodied insects in the soil. In terms of aggressive mimicry, the female flies of M. bomboides may enter into bumblebee nests to lay eggs. Due to their mimetic resemblance, M. bomboides females could then escape recognition and attack. Once hatched, the fly larvae could consume bumblebee larvae as a food source. However, all this is merely speculative and further experimentation will help elucidate the validity of this model.

=== Batesian mimicry ===
Batesian vs. Müllerian Mimicry

Experiments conducted by Brower et al. demonstrate that M. bomboides is a Batesian mimic of its bumblebee model and prey, B. americanorum (now more commonly known as Bombus pensylvanicus), which is noxious to predators such as the toad Bufo terretris due to its sting. In a 1921 experiment by Geoffrey Douglas Hale Carpenter, one monkey ate a wasp-like asilid presented to it with caution and another rejected the asilid as food altogether. However, the second monkey was willing to eat a non-mimetic asilid, suggesting that the first asilid is a true Batesian mimic. In other words, mimicry of an unpalatable species will lend species such as M. bomboides a form of protection from predators who have learned their lesson from an unpleasant previous attempt. In another experiment by Lloyd Morgan in 1896, it was discovered that a moorhen chick that had eaten and presumably been stung by a bumblebee rejected future offers of bumblebees, even with removed stings, as well as mimetic drone flies. An inexperienced chick was willing to accept these as food. In addition to supporting the hypothesis for Batesian mimicry, this experiment suggests that the noxious quality of the bumblebees is their sting. This was further supported by a series of feeding experiments conducted using toads and bees by Hugh B. Cott in 1936.

==== Requirements ====
In order that Batesian mimicry should evolve and remain an evolutionarily stable strategy, several prerequisites are deemed necessary.

1. Prospective models and mimics must occur together.
2. Models must outnumber mimics.
3. Models must possess a noxious and advertise this by means of conspicuous coloration.

For mimetic asilids like M. bomboides, these organisms attack their aculeate Hymenoptera models and will seek habitats abundant in their prey, thereby ensuring sympatry. All these conditions hold for the M. bomboides with their models, B. americanorum in a 1960 conducted by Brower et al. in south central Florida. The toad B. terrestris was used as caged predators to demonstrate that, despite their night foraging and lack of color vision, they can learn to reject bumblebees on sight alone and confuse mimetic flies with their apian hosts as well.

== Diet ==
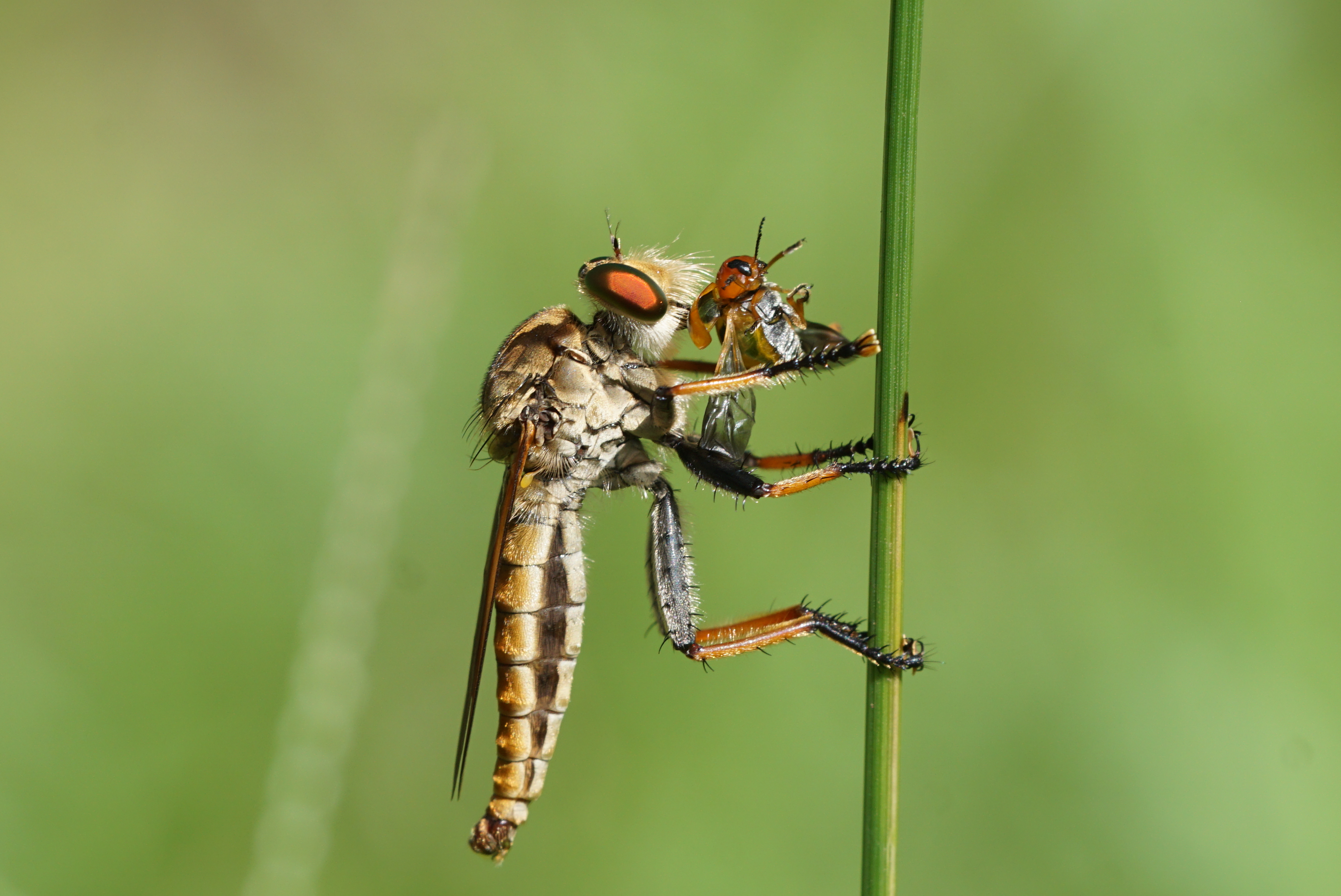
Example of Asilidae

As a member of the family Asilidae, M. bomboides preys on various aculeate Hymenoptera species. M. bomboides in particular prey on bumblebees such as Bombus pensylvanicus, to which M. bomboides bears remarkable resemblances.

== Reproduction ==
M. bomboides lay their eggs in soil.

== Economic importance ==
There are few instances of financials losses to beekeepers due to depredations of bee killers such as M. bomboides, but Florida is one of a few states where such losses have been reported as noteworthy. Little Lake City experienced an attack of over hundreds of these insects against bee hives in July 2008.
