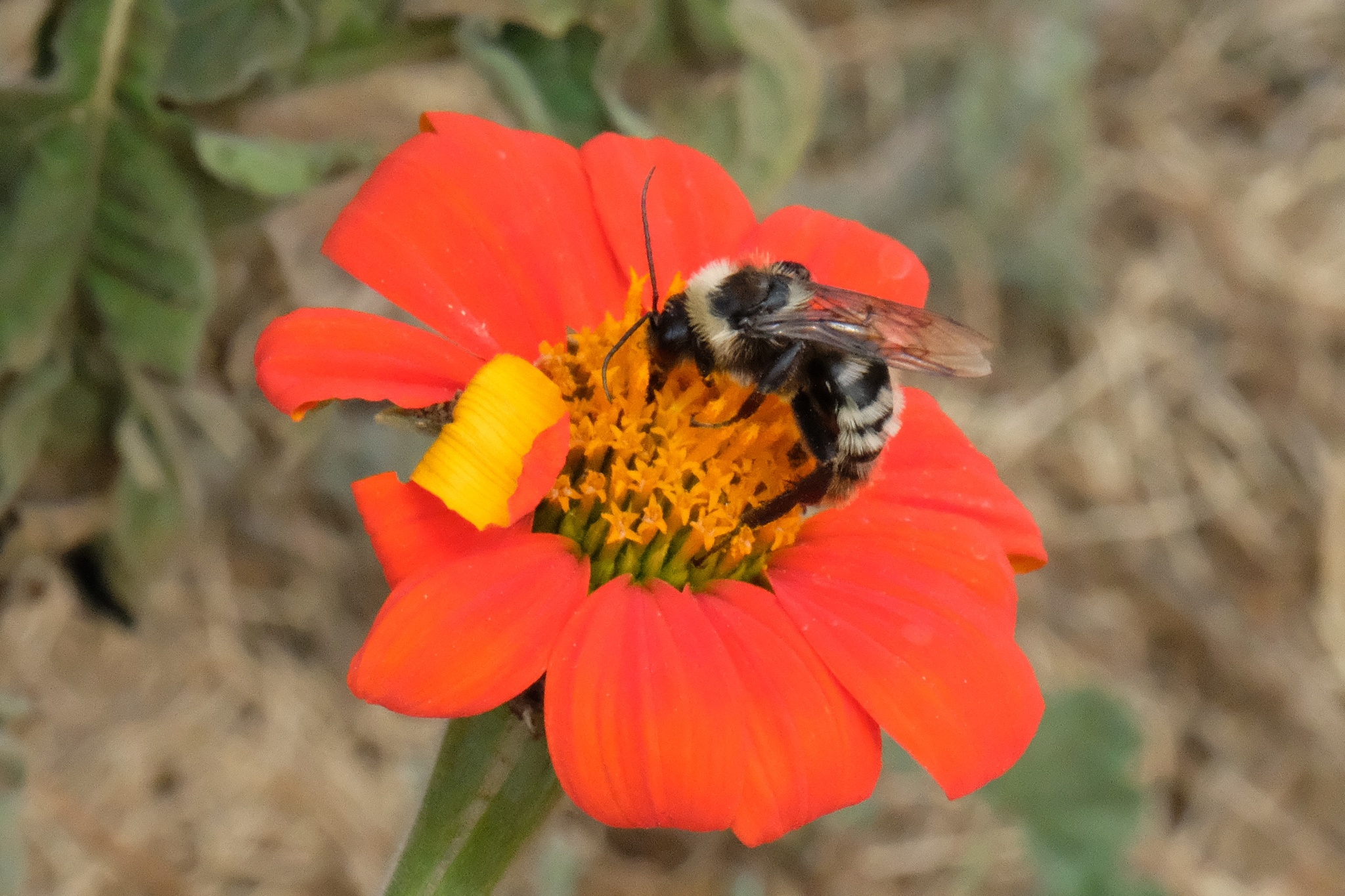

Conservation status
- Vulnerable (IUCN 3.1)

Scientific classification
- Kingdom: Animalia
- Phylum: Arthropoda
- Clade: Pancrustacea
- Class: Insecta
- Order: Hymenoptera
- Family: Apidae
- Tribe: Bombini
- Genus: Bombus
- Subgenus: Thoracobombus
- Species: B. californicus

Binomial name
- Bombus californicus Smith, 1854

Synonyms
- Bombus dubius Cresson, 1863; Bombus consanguineus Handlirsch, 1888; Bombus neglectulus Ashmead, 1902

= Bombus californicus =

Species of bee

Bombus californicus, the California bumble bee, is a species of bumble bee in the family Apidae. Bombus californicus is in the subgenus Thoracobombus. It is found in Central America and the western half of North America. Bombus californicus is classified as Vulnerable by the IUCN.

== Endangerment ==
In a 2015 study, Bombus californicus was found to be endangered in 62% of surveyed areas. In 2022, researchers also collected DNA samples from bumblebees across the state of California, reconfirming that the Bombus californicus population is still declining rapidly. Bombus californicus, which was typically found all over the state, is now being found less and less in southern California.

== Activism and social media ==
Bombus californicus, along with many other bumblebees in California, is on the brink of extinction. The issue is that there are not many people who actually know about these groups. On social media, the majority of the younger generations are not going to act on conservation media that is being shown to them. One way that has been shown to work is to use a peripheral route in persuasion or have a celebrity or someone trustworthy to convince the younger generations (Gen Y, Gen Z, and Gen Alpha) that whatever the celebrity is endorsing is reliable. In a study in China, it shares how information is also easily misinterpreted. The study uses a platform called WeChat and experimented with how much the users of the app would learn or not learn about wildlife conservation. The study concludes by finding that it is very easy to misinterpret information on social media. There are positives, however, social media has been used for productive wildlife conservation. The Florida Fish and Wildlife Conservation Commission set up a competition to see who could catch the most lionfish. In 2019, 24,571 individual lionfish were removed from coastal waters, and in 2021, the tournament was again successful, raising $95,000 USD in prize money, registering 146 participants, and removing 10,250 lionfish. But by having a social media platform that balances eye-catching aesthetics and helpful information about what someone consuming the information can do next without harming wildlife, more conservation efforts for Bombus californicus and other native bees can start building up, and there could be a change in our future for our native wildlife.

== Characteristics ==
Bombus californicus can exhibit multiple possible color patterns of yellow and black, as in its sister species Bombus fervidus, and in many areas of geographic overlap, at least a small percentage of individuals of the two species cannot be recognized except by genetic analysis, as each species can sometimes display the color pattern typical of the other. The "typical" color pattern of female californicus is black with only a single strong yellow band anteriorly on the thorax, and another single yellow band near the apex of the abdomen; males exhibit considerably more variation.

Bombus californicus nests in the ground, in wooded areas, and in urban areas. Queens emerge from April through the middle of July. Workers are present from April to September. Males (drones) are present late May through September. This type of bumblebee pollinates sage, blueberry bushes, red clover, California poppies, and many other species of flowers.
