= Queen Anne's lace =

Queen Anne's lace is a common name for a number of plants in the family Apiaceae, including:

- Ammi majus, native to the Nile River Valley
- Anthriscus sylvestris, a herbaceous biennial or short-lived perennial plant
- Daucus carota, native to temperate Eurasia and naturalized in Australia and North America; the wild form of the domesticated carrot
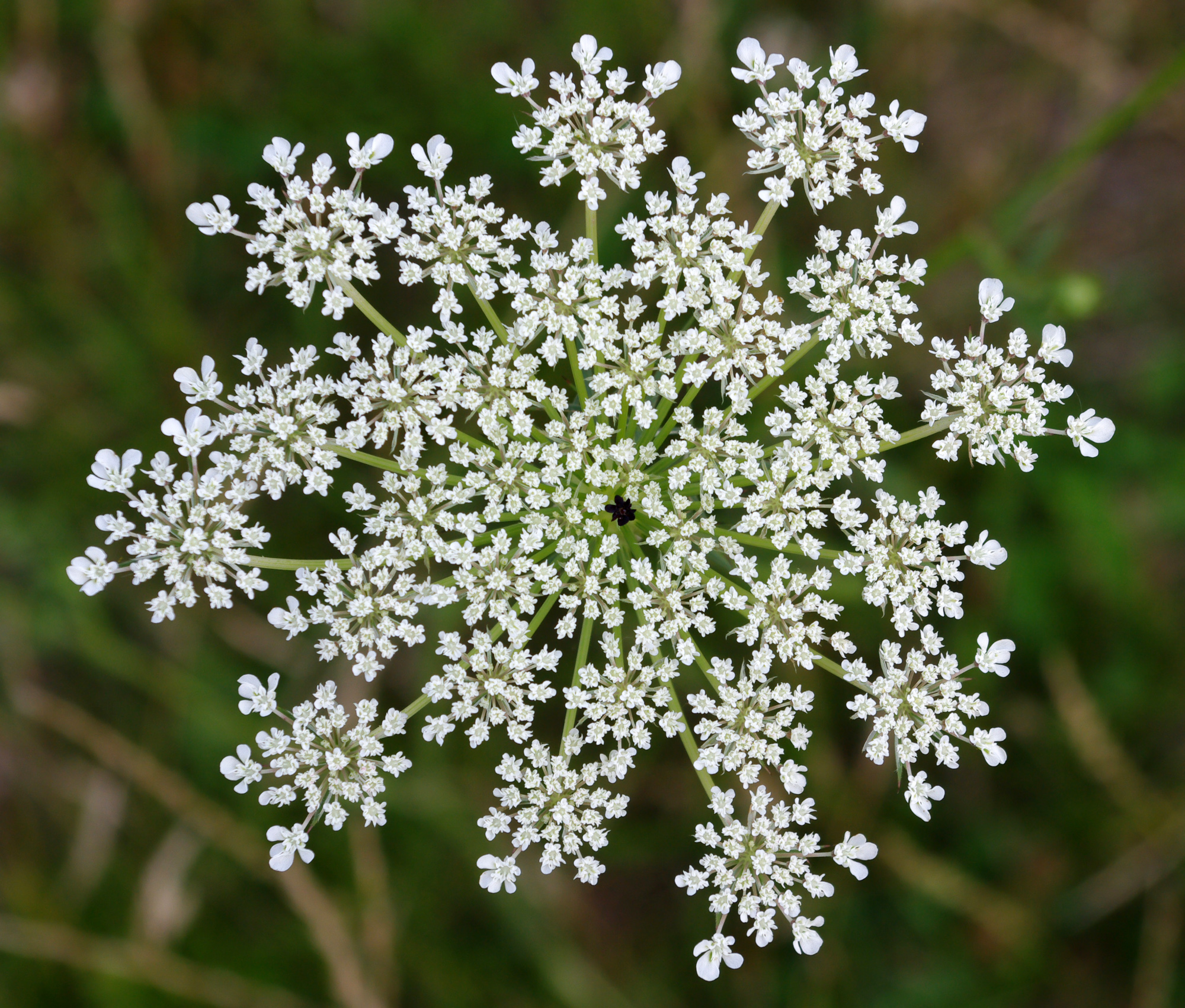
Daucus carota

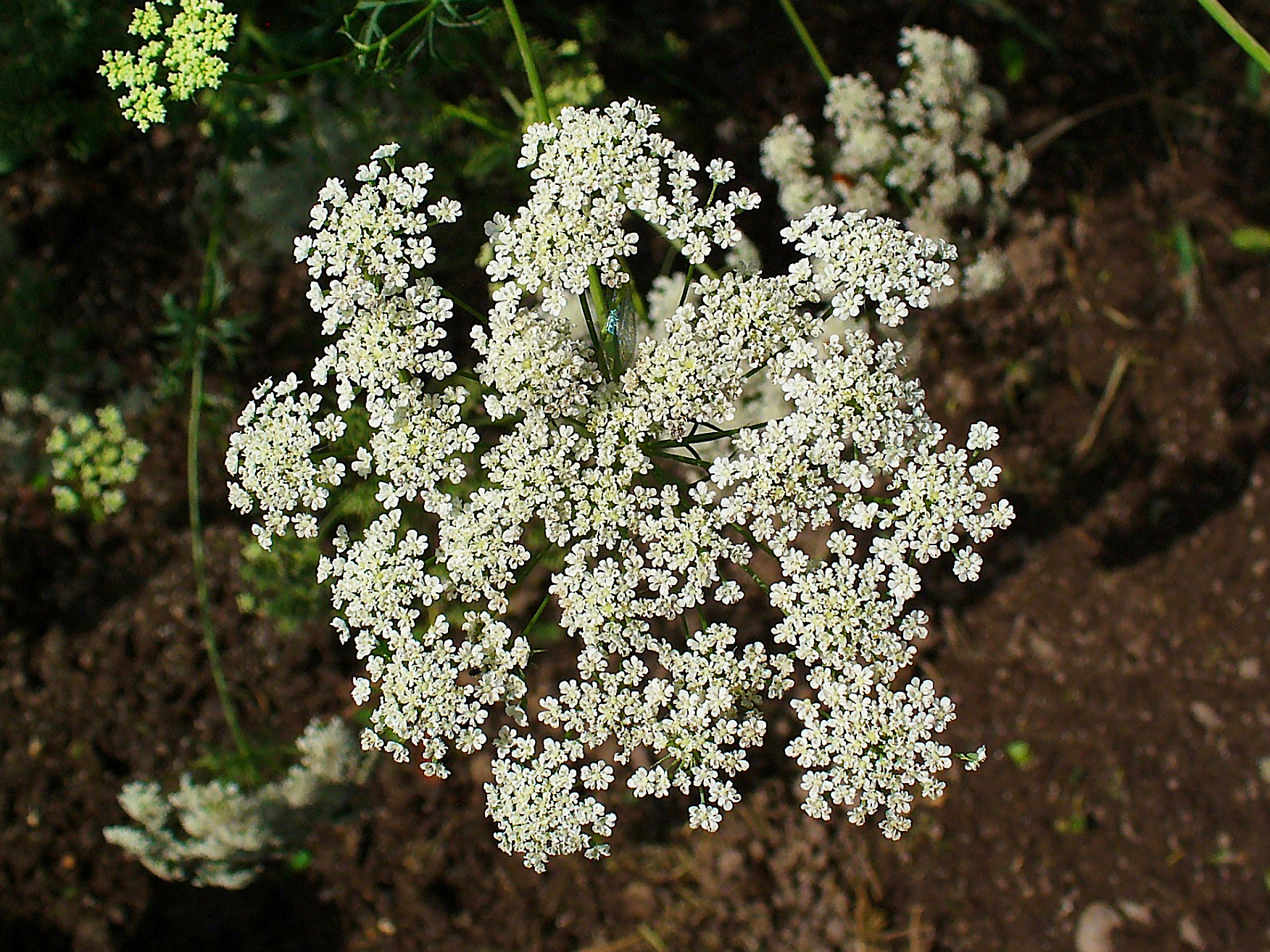
Ammi majus

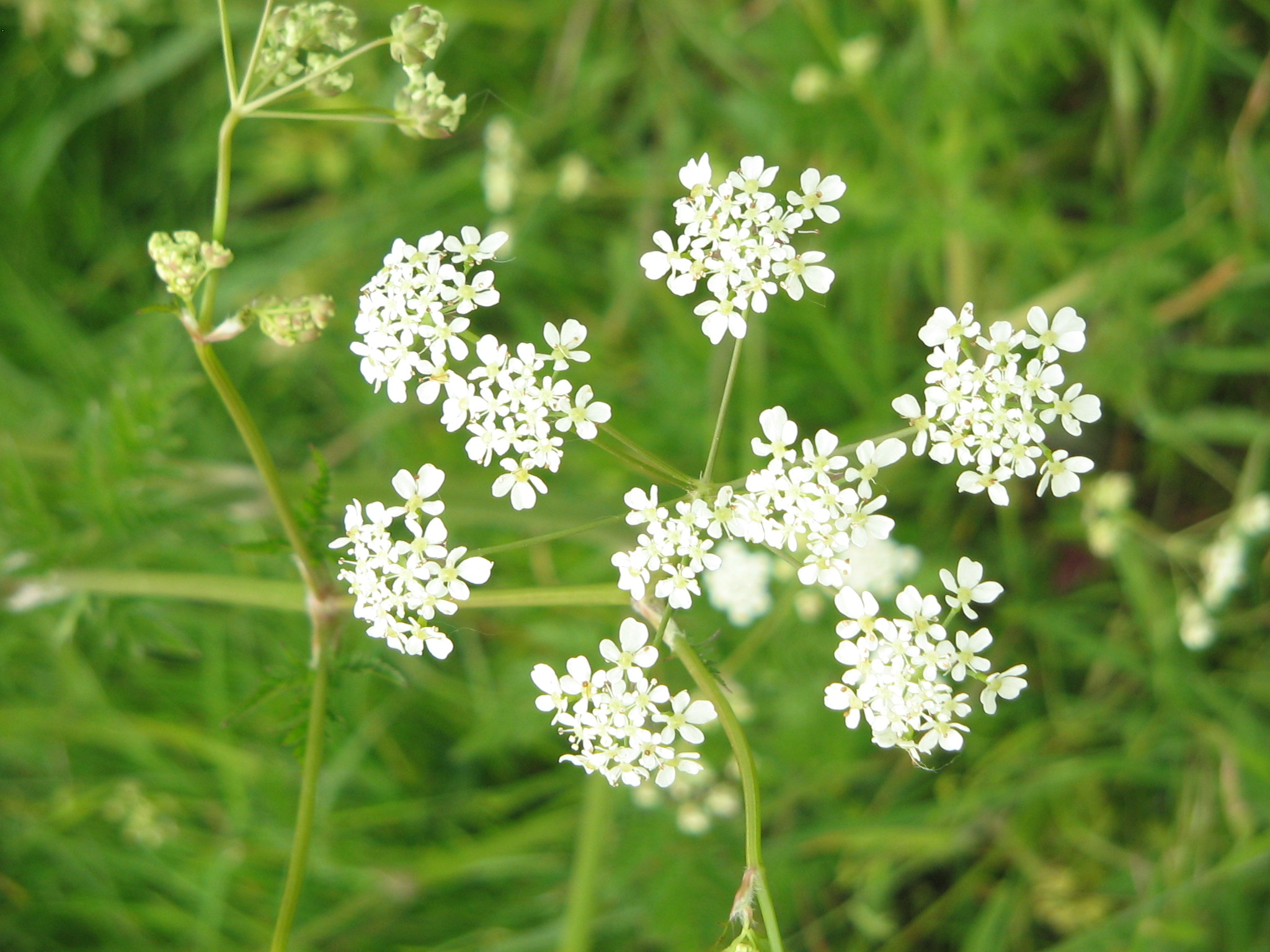
Anthriscus sylvestris
