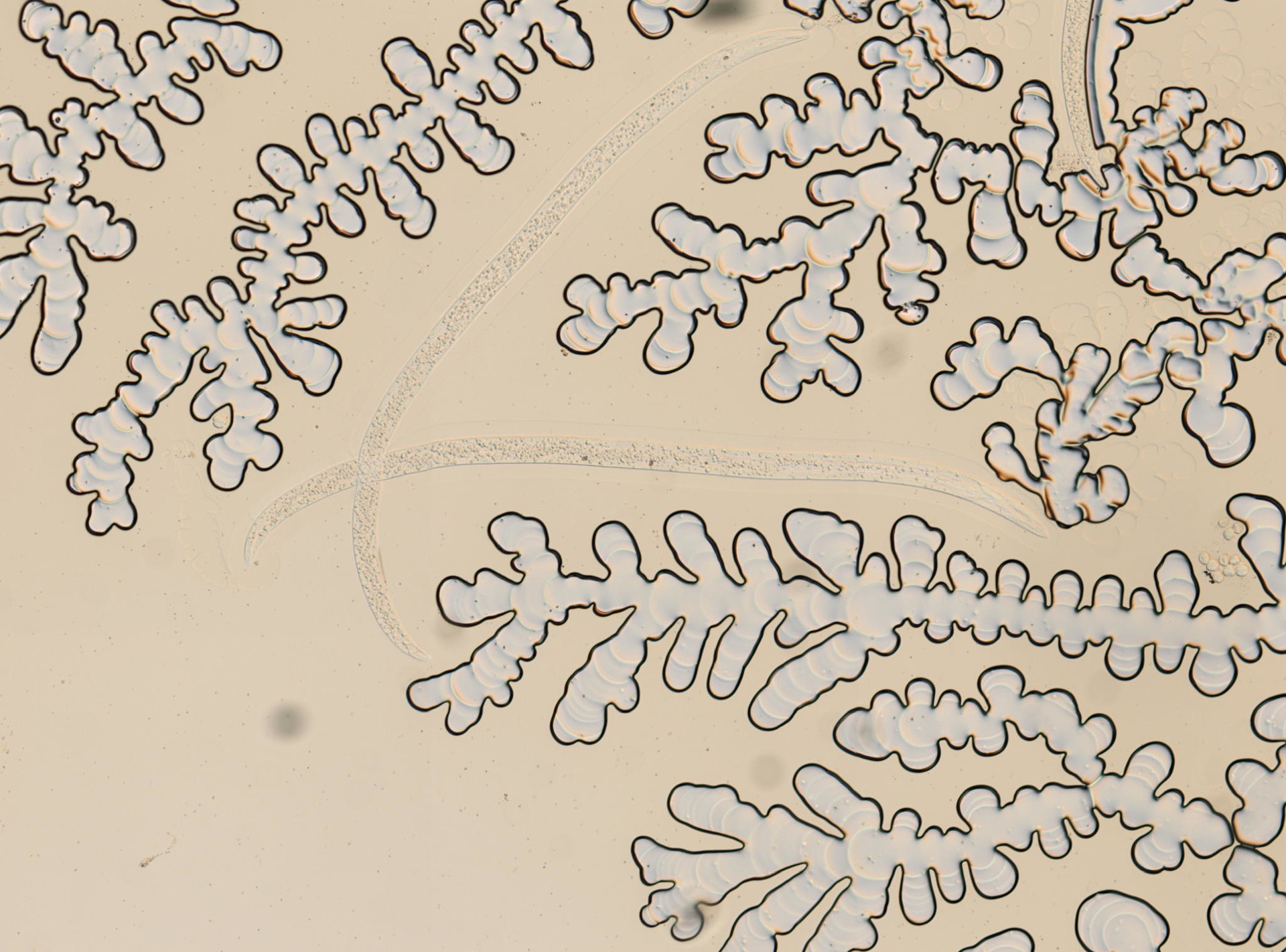

Scientific classification
- Kingdom: Animalia
- Phylum: Nematoda
- Class: Secernentea
- Order: Tylenchida
- Family: Sphaerulariidae
- Genus: Sphaerularia
- Species: S. bombi

Binomial name
- Sphaerularia bombi Dufour, 1837

= Sphaerularia bombi =

Species of roundworm

Sphaerularia bombi is an entomopathogenic nematode. It is parasite of bumblebees. It infects and sterilizes gynes or potential queens of bumblebees.

== Life Cycle ==
Sphaerularia bombi is a nematode that infects hibernating bumblebees. Bumblebees start seeking out a hibernation site for the winter season during fall and autumn. S. bombi would cause the infected bee multiple fail attempts to burrow into the ground, and with each fail attempt hundreds of 3rd stage larvae would be discharged from the bee's anal opening. The larvae would eventually develop into the 4th larvae stage, this is the period where the infected bee dies. When a healthy bee finds its hibernation site, the 3rd stage larvae would infect the bee by penetrating it. The bee emerges to the surface during the spring season, and by that time the nematodes has developed into a mature female producing eggs within the bumblebee; 1st larvae stage. The eggs then hatches and molts into the 2nd larvae stage, which then rapidly molts into the 3rd larvae; the 3rd larvae stage is the infective stage for S. bombi. These 3rd stage larvae would be in the bee's hemocoel, midgut, and hindgut.

== Morphology ==
Once in the host, the uterus and other related reproductive counterparts of the female S. bombi turn inside out, allowing for the uterine cells to stretch out and expand into a sac. The sac, also known as a prolapsed uterus, is composed of an ovary, oviduct, and sperm, and is found all over the body of the parasite. These “bumps” on the parasite's body bulge into bigger sacs to create a larger surface area for absorbing nutrients from the host via pinocytosis. Once absorbed, the nutrients are digested and delivered through the ovary-oviduct to the eggs. Developing eggs from the uterine sac develop into third-stage juveniles once they disperse into the host's hemocoel. Although the eggs develop, there is no apparent growth of the parasite that initially produced the eggs. At this stage, the nematode is nothing but an enormous uterus filled with eggs, with a tiny appendix containing the remaining organs.

== Distribution ==
Canada, France, Germany, Netherlands, New Zealand, Norway, Sweden, USA, Argentina
