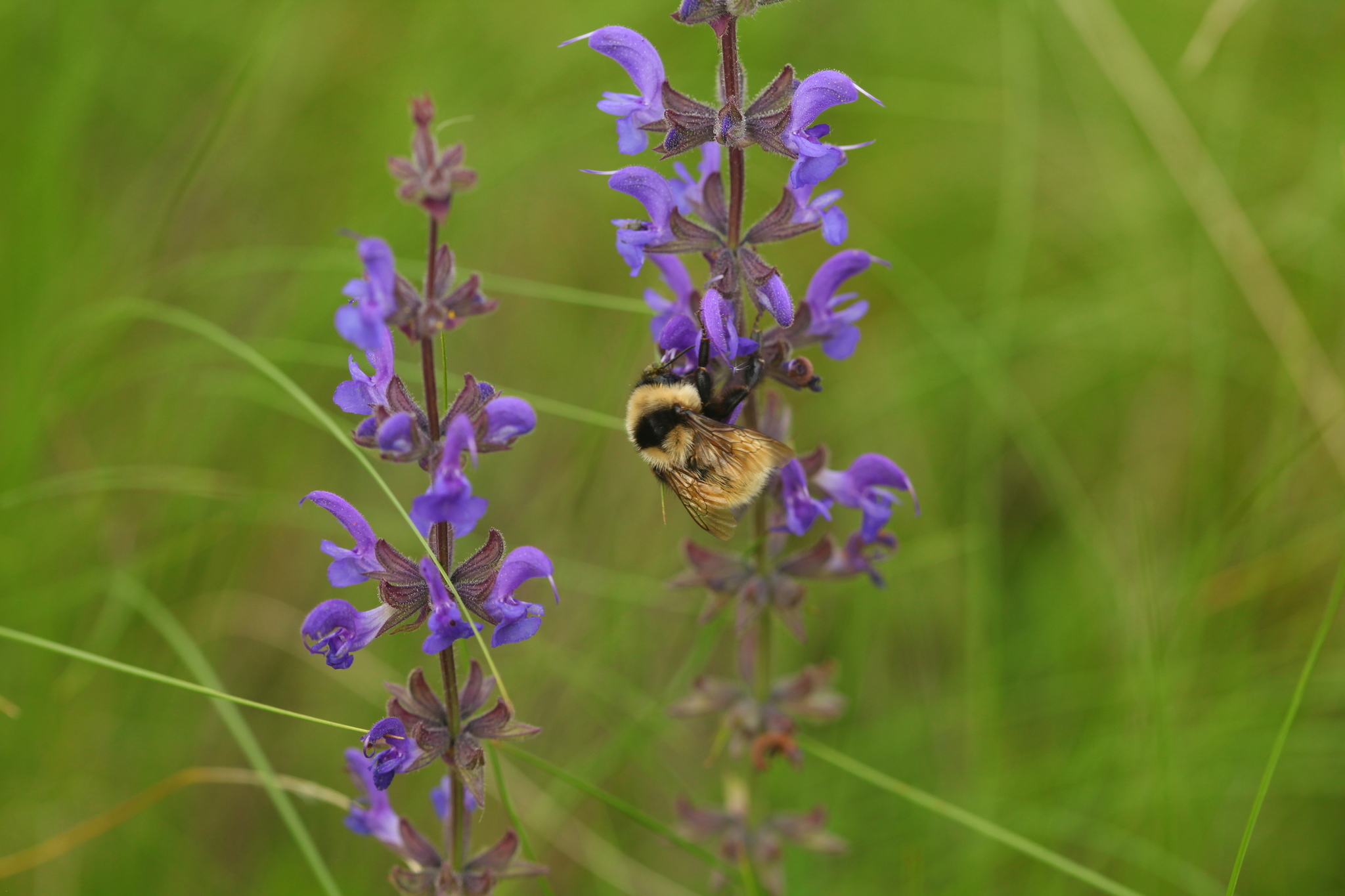

Conservation status
- Endangered (IUCN 3.1)

Scientific classification
- Domain: Eukaryota
- Kingdom: Animalia
- Phylum: Arthropoda
- Class: Insecta
- Order: Hymenoptera
- Family: Apidae
- Genus: Bombus
- Subgenus: Thoracobombus
- Species: B. armeniacus

Binomial name
- Bombus armeniacus Radoszkowski, 1877

Synonyms
- Megabombus armeniacus (Radoszkowski, 1877)

= Bombus armeniacus =

Armenian bumblebee

Species of bee

The Armenian bumblebee (Bombus armeniacus) is a species of bumblebee found in Greece, Austria, the Czech Republic, Russia, and the Near East.
