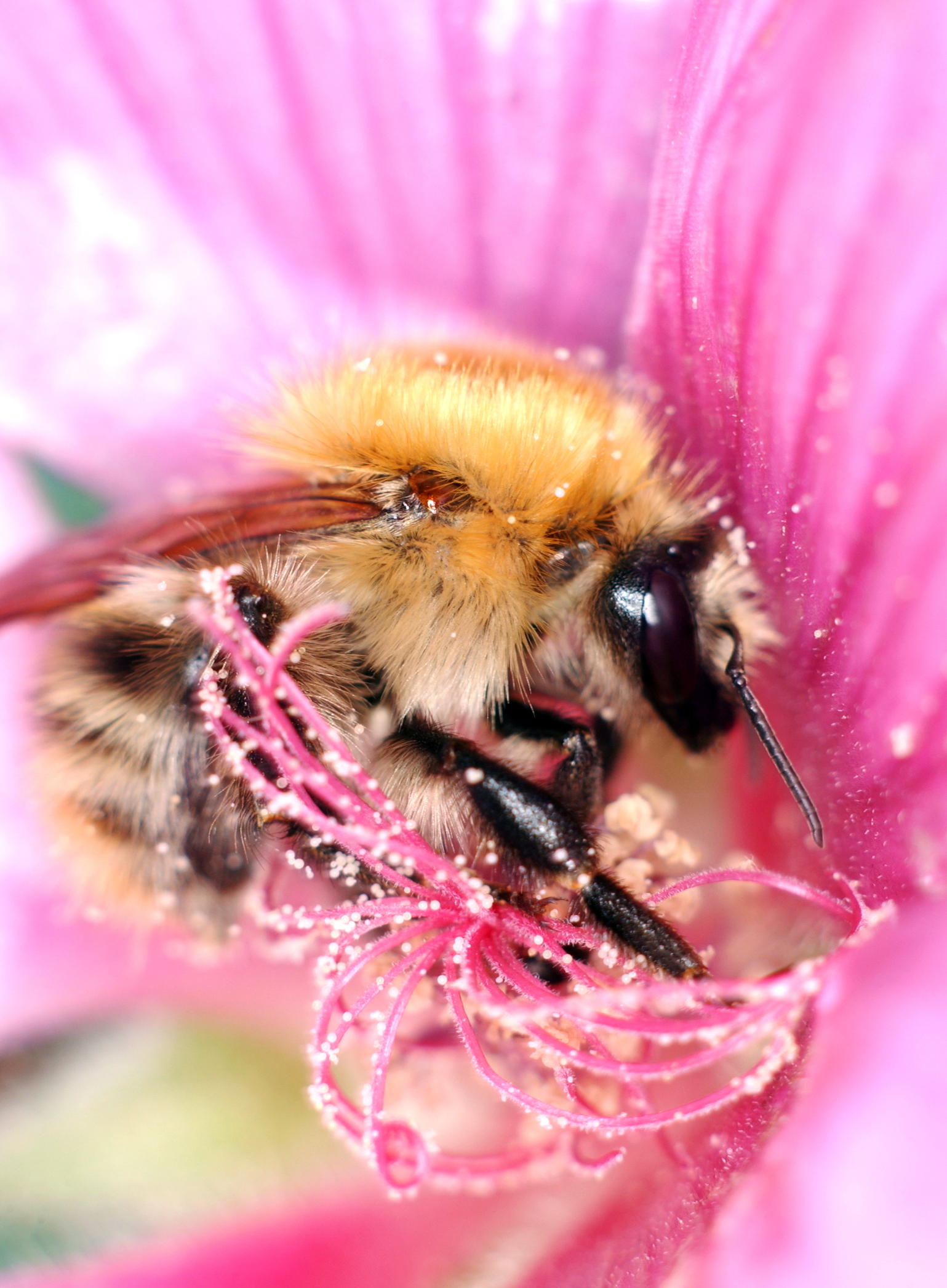
- Bombus pomorum

Scientific classification
- Kingdom: Animalia
- Phylum: Arthropoda
- Clade: Pancrustacea
- Class: Insecta
- Order: Hymenoptera
- Family: Apidae
- Genus: Bombus
- Subgenus: Thoracobombus
- Species: B. pomorum

Binomial name
- Bombus pomorum (Panzer, 1805)

= Bombus pomorum =

Species of bee

The apple humble-bee or apple bumblebee (Bombus pomorum) is a species of bumblebee.

== Description ==
This bumblebee is black with a red tail, an oblong head, and a long proboscis. The male has pale hairs on the collar, scutellum, and first tergite (abdominal segment). The queen has a body length between 20 and 22 mm (0.79 and 0.87 in), the worker around 14 mm (0.55 in), and the male 15 mm (0.59 in).

== Distribution ==
The apple humble-bee is found in western and central Europe and western Turkey, from northern France to the Perm region in Russia. Its reach is declining and once had a much wider distribution. It was once present in the United Kingdom and was found once in Kent recently, but it is doubtful it is still established there.

== Ecology ==
This species is mainly found in wood-edges and open fields. The Turkish subspecies B. p. canus, however, lives on more or less alpine steppes at altitudes between 1,600 and 3,500 m (5,200 and 11,500 ft).
