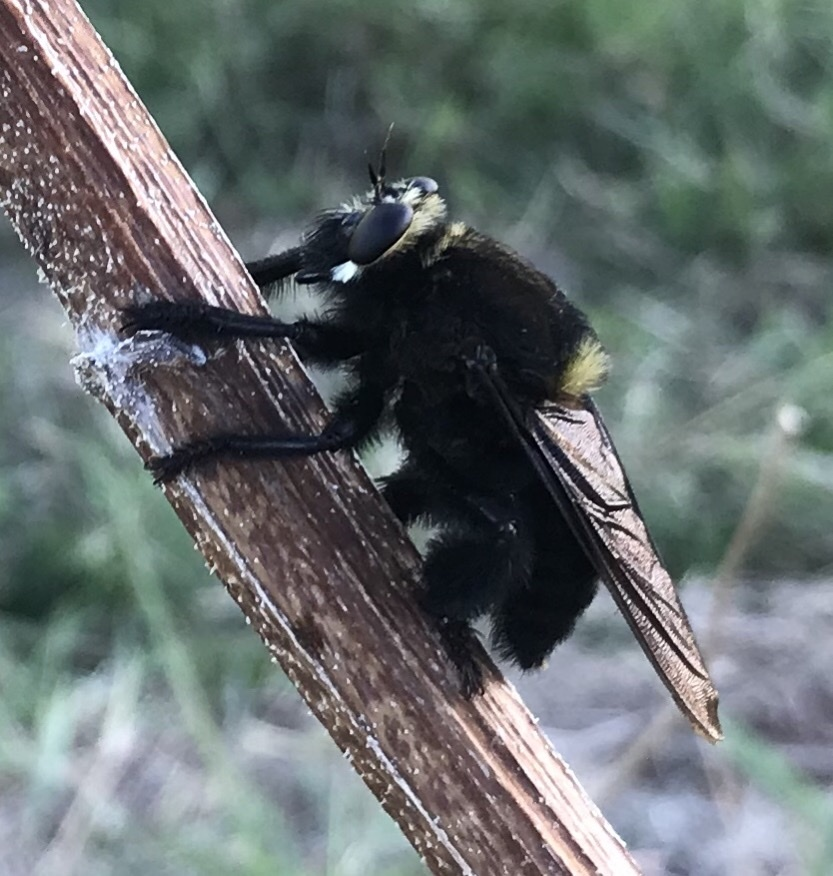

Scientific classification
- Domain: Eukaryota
- Kingdom: Animalia
- Phylum: Arthropoda
- Class: Insecta
- Order: Diptera
- Family: Asilidae
- Genus: Mallophora
- Species: M. leschenaulti

Binomial name
- Mallophora leschenaulti Macquart, 1838

Synonyms
- Mallophora belzebul Schiner, 1867

= Mallophora leschenaulti =

Species of fly

Mallophora leschenaulti, known generally as the belzebul bee-eater or black bee killer, is a species of robber fly in the family Asilidae. It is regularly known from Texas and Mexico, and has been reported as far south as Argentina and as far north as Colorado.
