= Sphaerulariidae =

Scientific classification
- Domain: Eukaryota
- Kingdom: Animalia
- Phylum: Nematoda
- Class: Secernentea
- Order: Tylenchida
- Family: Sphaerulariidae

Family of roundworms

Sphaerulariidae is a family of nematodes belonging to the order Tylenchida.

Genera:

- Prothallonema Christie, 1938
- Sphaerularia Dufour, 1837
- Tripius Chitwood, 1935
- Veleshkinema
